= List of SAP products =

This presents a partial list of products of the enterprise software company SAP SE.

== Major units ==
- SAP S/4HANA (Enterprise resource planning on-premise and cloud)
- SAP Business ByDesign (SME Cloud Enterprise Resource Planning)
- SAP Business One (B1 on HANA) (Small enterprise Enterprise Resource Planning)
- SAP CRM (Customer Relationship Management) (legacy product)
- SAP ERP (Enterprise resource planning) (legacy product, see S/4HANA)
- SAP PLM (Product Lifecycle Management) (legacy product)
- SAP SCM (Supply Chain Management) (legacy product)
- SAP SRM (Supplier Relationship Management) (legacy product)

== Business software ==
- SAP Advanced Data Migration (ADP)
- SAP Advanced Planner and Optimizer
- SAP Analytics Cloud (SAC)
- SAP Advanced Business Application Programming (ABAP)
- SAP Apparel and Footwear Solution (AFS)
- SAP Business Information Warehouse (BW)
- SAP Business ByDesign (ByD)
- SAP Business Explorer (Bex)
- SAP BusinessObjects Lumira
- SAP BusinessObjects Web Intelligence (Webi)
- SAP Business One
- SAP Business Partner Screening
- SAP Business Intelligence (BI)
- SAP Business Workflow
- SAP Catalog Content Management ()
- SAP Cloud for Customer (C4C)
- SAP Cost Center Accounting (CCA)
- SAP Convergent Charging (CC)
- SAP Converged Cloud
- SAP Crystal Reports
- SAP Data Warehouse Cloud (DWC)
- SAP Design Studio
- SAP PRD2(P2)
- SAP Enterprise Buyer Professional (EBP)
- SAP Enterprise Learning
- SAP Portal (EP)
- SAP Exchange Infrastructure (XI) (From release 7.0 onwards, SAP XI has been renamed as SAP Process Integration (SAP PI))
- SAP Extended Warehouse Management (EWM)
- SAP FICO
- SAP BPC (Business Planning and Consolidation, formerly OutlookSoft)
- SAP GRC (Governance, Risk and Compliance)
- SAP EHSM (Environment Health & Safety Management)
- Enterprise Central Component (ECC)
- SAP ERP
- SAP HANA (formerly known as High-performance Analytics Appliance)
- SAP Human Resource Management Systems (HRMS)
- SAP SuccessFactors
- SAP Information Design Tool (IDT)
- SAP Integrated Business Planning (IBP)
- SAP Internet Transaction Server (ITS)
- SAP Incentive and Commission Management (ICM)
- SAP IT Operations Analytics (ITOA)
- SAP Jam
- SAP Knowledge Warehouse (KW)
- SAP Manufacturing
- SAP Marketing Cloud
- SAP Materials Management (MM), a module in SAP ERP Central Component (ECC), that provides companies with materials, inventory and warehouse management capabilities
- SAP Master Data Management (MDM)
- SAP Plant Maintenance (PM), software for industrial companies, with which all important tasks of maintenance of technical systems can be represented. These include in particular inspection, maintenance and actual repair.
- SAP Production Planning (PP)
- SAP Product Lifecycle Costing (PLC)
- SAP Profitability and Cost Management (PCM)
- SAP Project System (PS)
- SAP Rapid Deployment Solutions (RDS)
- SAP Service and Asset Management
- SAP Supply Network Collaboration (SNC)
- SAP Solutions for mobile business
- SAP Sales and Distribution (SD)
- SAP Solution Composer
- SAP Strategic Enterprise Management (SEM)
- SAP Test Data Migration Server (TDMS)
- SAP Training and Event Management (TEM)
- SAP Transportation Management (TM)
- SAP NetWeaver Application Server (Web AS)
- SAP xApps
- SAP Sales Cloud (previously: CallidusCloud)
- SAP Supply Chain Performance Management (SCPM)
- SAP Supply Chain Management (SCM)
- SAP Sustainability Performance Management (SUPM)
- SAP S/4HANA
- SAP Master Data Governance (MDG)
- SAP S/4HANA Cloud

== Industry software ==
- SAP for Retail
- SAP for Utilities (ISU)
- SAP for Public Sector (IS PSCD)
- SAP for Oil & Gas (IS Oil & Gas)
- SAP for Media (ISM)
- SAP for Telecommunications (IST)
- SAP for Healthcare (ISH)
- SAP Banking (SAP Banking)
- SAP for Insurance (SAP for Insurance)
- SAP Financial Services Network (FSN)
- SAP Shipping Services Network (SSN)
- Engineering Construction & Operations (EC&O)
- SAP IS Airlines & Defense
- SAP for Discrete Industries and Mill Products (IS DIMP)

== Software for small and midsize enterprises ==
- SAP Business One (Small enterprise ERP 6.2, 6.5, 2004, 2005, 2007, 8.8x, 9.X, 10.x)
- SAP Business ByDesign (SME Cloud ERP)

== Platforms and frameworks ==
- SAP Cloud Infrastructure
- SAP NS2, a U.S.-based subsidiary that delivers SAP solutions for U.S. government and other regulated customers.
- SAP Cloud Platform (Its brand name is removed in January 2021 in favor of SAP Business Technology Platform)
- SAP Enterprise Services Architecture
- SAP NetWeaver Platform
  - SAP NetWeaver Portal (formerly SAP Enterprise Portal)
  - SAP NetWeaver BI (formerly SAP NetWeaver BW- "BW" is still used to describe the underlying data warehouse area and accelerator components)
  - SAP NetWeaver Visual Composer
  - SAP Auto-ID Infrastructure
  - SAP Composite Application Framework
  - SAP NetWeaver Development Infrastructure
  - SAP NetWeaver Identity Management
  - SAP NetWeaver Single Sign-On
- SAP Business Connector (deprecated/removed from product range)
- SAP HANA
- SAP IQ
- SAP AppGyver

=== Legacy platforms ===
- SAP R/2
- SAP R/3

== Others ==
- OpenUI5
- SAP CCMS, monitoring program
- SAP GUI
- eCATT
- SAP Central Process Scheduling, process automation and job scheduler
- SAP Fiori for mobile devices announced in May 2013
- SAP Solution Manager
- Sybase ASE
- Sybase SQL Anywhere
- SAP Ariba
- SAP Fieldglass
- SAP Concur
- SAP Hybris
- SAP Signavio
- SAP LeanIX
- SAP Taulia
