= SAP Solution Manager =

Business software suite

SAP Solution Manager is a product developed by the software company SAP SE. It offers end-to-end application lifecycle management to streamline business processes and proactively address improvement options, increasing efficiency and decreasing risk within SAP customers' existing maintenance agreements and managing the application lifecycle.

== Overview ==
SAP Solution Manager is a central support and system management suite provided to SAP's customers as part of their license agreement. As an SAP system landscape may include a large number of installed SAP and non-SAP systems, SAP Solution Manager is intended to reduce and centralize the management of these systems as well as end-to-end business processes. SAP Solution Manager covers the complete application lifecycle of an SAP customer's business processes running on-premise, hybrid, or in the cloud.

In an SAP customer's landscape, the SAP Solution Manager is the managing system, and the business suite applications (e.g. ERP, CRM, BI, EP) are the managed systems. Non-SAP systems in the landscape can also be covered as part of end-to-end business process lifecycle management. The managed customer landscape can consist of on-premise, cloud, or a combination of both. Business processes and changes can also be documented during major releases, minor releases, and bugfixes, making the platform an important business platform as well as an IT platform to provide a "single source of the truth" reference model for the customer.

The current release of SAP Solution Manager is 7.2, which provides features for both IT and business users for enhancing, automating, and improving the management of SAP and non-SAP systems:

- Project Management
- Process Management
- Test Suite
- Change Control Management
- IT Service Management
- Application Operations
- Business Process Operations
- Landscape Management
- Data Volume Management
- Custom Code Management.

The current version of SAP Solution Manager is SAP Solution Manager 7.2, available since August 2016.

Support Package Stack 17 for SAP Solution Manager 7.2 was released in July 2023, delivering innovations based on customer innovation requests. Accordingly, the product’s documentation was updated with new release information.

Some of the claimed benefits of using SAP Solution Manager 7.2 are that it helps:

- Support the orchestration of the entire end-to-end customer business scenarios, processes, and steps via business process modeling, change control, IT service management, and a robust monitoring and alerting infrastructure
- Is the value companion for implementing and operating all of SAP's next-generation products, such as SAP S/4HANA
- Provides simple, web-based user interfaces and management dashboards, and embedded graphical modeling capability
- Increases efficiency with both Application and Business Process Operations for central control of critical operations support tasks
- Support the business with business process modeling, automated business blueprint generation, and business process usage analysis and analytics
- Reduces risk from changes to the environment with risk-based testing applications such as the Business Process Change Analyzer and Scope and Effort Analyzer
- Streamlines and reduces the custom code footprint of the customer's SAP systems through Custom Code Management
- Provide customers with generous usage rights for support of non-SAP components and without the need for named system users, included in the customer's SAP Enterprise Support contract
- Includes the powerful Focused Build requirements-to-deploy process, and Focused Insights analytical dashboards at no additional charge as of January 1, 2020

SAP Solution Manager 7.2 also features improved support for hybrid (on-premises and on-cloud) landscapes, as well as new user interfaces based on SAP Fiori. 7.2 can also run on the SAP HANA database as an option. The SAP Solution Manager Product Roadmap has been updated with more details.
