= Shai Agassi =

Israeli entrepreneur (born 1968)

- שי אגסי
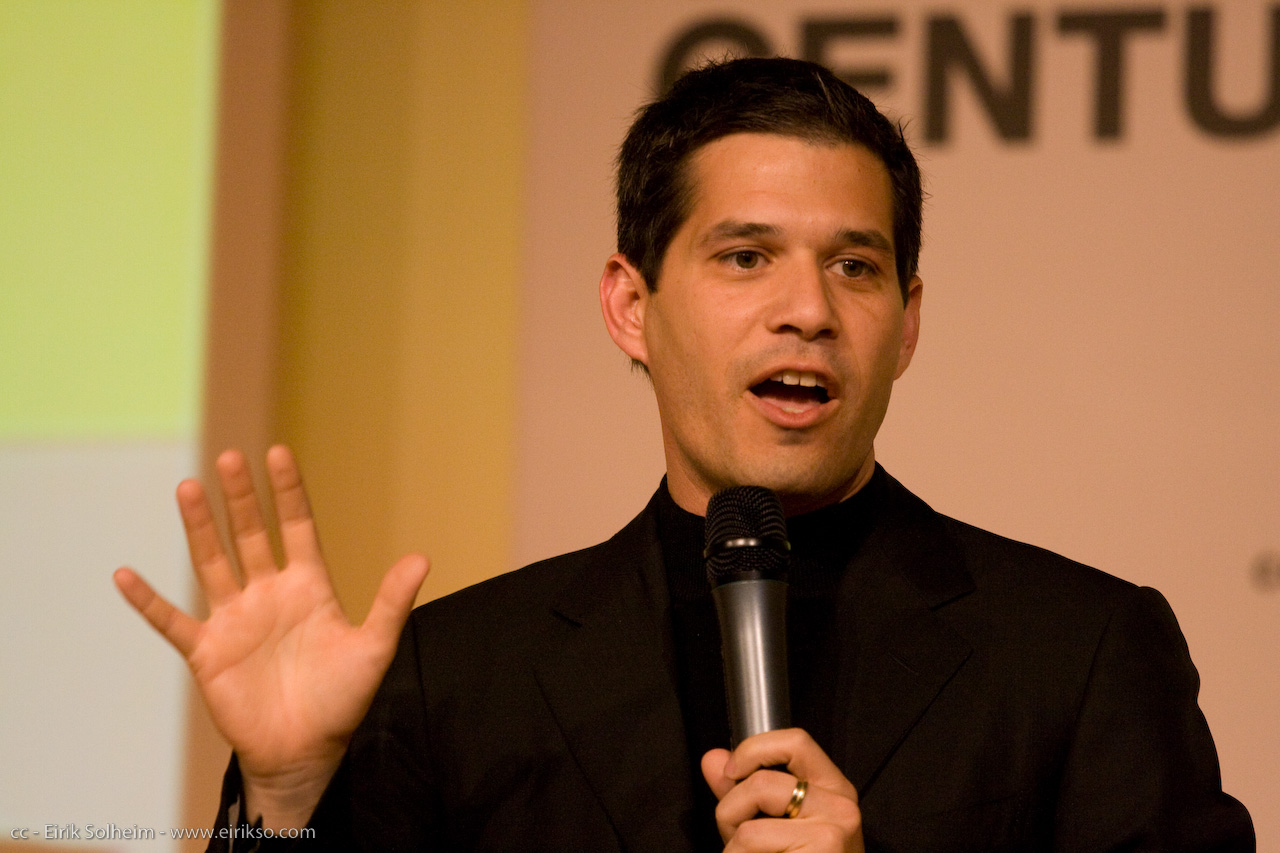
- Agassi in 2008
- Born: April 19, 1968 (age 58); Ramat-Gan, Israel
- Education: Technion (BA)
- Occupation: Founder of Better Place
- Spouse: Tami Chotoveli
- Children: 5

Shai Agassi (Hebrew: שי אגסי; born April 19, 1968) is an Israeli entrepreneur known for his involvement in the electric vehicle industry. He is the founder and former CEO of Better Place, which had developed a model and infrastructure for employing electric cars as an alternative to fossil fuel technology. The company went bankrupt in 2013, after Agassi spent over $850 million while deploying fewer than 1000 cars.

Prior to founding Better Place, Agassi was President of the Products and Technology Group (PTG) at SAP AG until 2007. In 2003, at the age of 36, Agassi was named one of the top 20 'Global Influentials for 2003' by CNN-Time magazine. In 2008, he was named one of TIME's "Heroes of the Environment". In 2009, Agassi was included in TIME magazine's 100 most influential people list. In 2010, Foreign Policy magazine included Agassi on its annual list of the 100 most influential global thinkers.

Throughout the 1990s, Agassi started and sold a number of technology startups, in the areas of enterprise software, internet technology, multimedia and small business administration. Agassi has a bachelor's degree in computer science and has been awarded a large number of patents in software, automotive and energy infrastructure.

== Software entrepreneurship ==
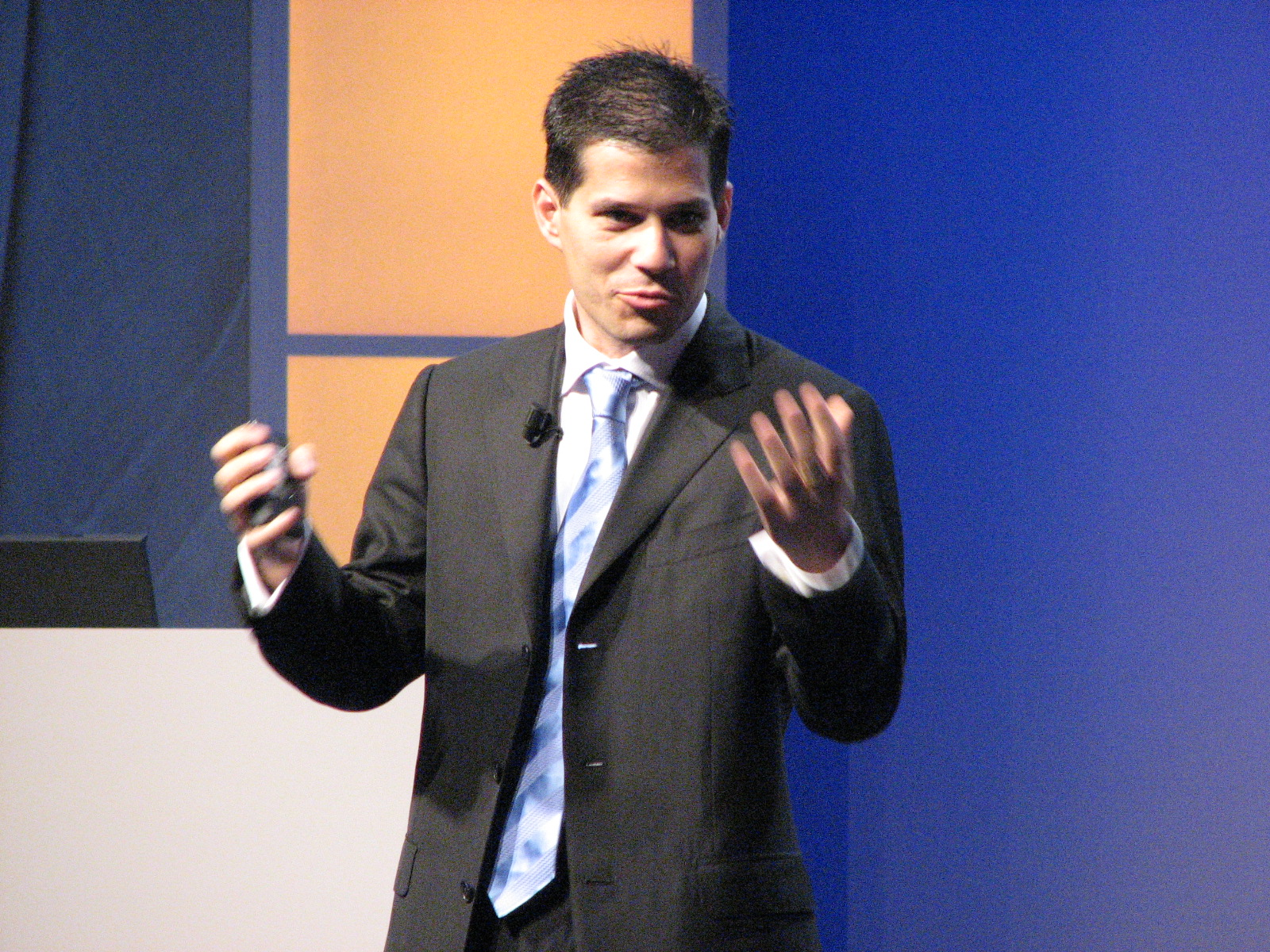
Shai Agassi in 2006

After graduating from Technion - Israel Institute of Technology, Agassi set out as a software entrepreneur. He founded TopTier Software (originally called Quicksoft Development) in Israel in 1992 and later moved the company's headquarters to California. Agassi served the company in various capacities including chairman, chief technology officer, and then CEO. He was directly involved in all critical phases of the company's development, including its strategic plan, technical direction and financing, management of two acquisitions, and negotiation of OEM agreements with companies such as SAP, Baan Corporation, and Microsoft. TopTier was a leading enterprise portal vendor when SAP acquired the company in April 2001 at a price of US$400 million.

In addition to TopTier Software, Agassi co-founded several other companies with his father, Reuven Agassi, including Quicksoft Ltd., a leading multimedia software localization and distribution company in the Israeli market; TopManage, a developer of small business software that was also acquired by SAP in April 2002 (which became SAP Business One, the small business offering by SAP); and Quicksoft Media, a multimedia production company that ceased operations in 1995.

== SAP executive ==
He wished to be the next CEO of SAP after Henning Kagermann vacated that space in 2007. However, Mr. Kagermann's contract as CEO was extended until 2009 by the supervisory board. This led Agassi to resign.

At SAP, he was responsible for SAP's overall technology strategy and execution. In this leadership position, he oversaw the development of the integration and application platform SAP NetWeaver, SAP xApps packaged composite applications, SAP SRM, and SAP Business One. Before his appointment to the SAP Executive Board, Agassi was CEO of SAP Portals and later of the combined company SAP Markets and SAP Portals, which previously operated as a fully owned subsidiary of SAP AG. He was appointed to the SAP Executive Board in 2002. Together with the head of the Application Platform & Architecture (AP&A) group, Peter Zencke, Agassi co-led the Suite Architecture Team, which aligns the software architecture across all SAP solutions.

== Better Place ==
In January 2008, the Israeli government announced its support for a broad effort to promote the use of electric cars, embracing a joint venture between Better Place, Renault and its partner, Nissan. Renault and Better Place were to work on the development of electric cars which could be powered by exchangeable batteries.

Agassi initially raised $200 million for this project. Investors included VantagePoint Venture Partners, Israel Corporation, Israel Cleantech Ventures, Morgan Stanley, and private investors led by Michael Granoff of Maniv Energy Capital. In 2009, he raised an additional $135 million for Better Place Denmark, including an investment from DONG Energy, the leading utility in Denmark. Following the announcement in Israel, Better Place had launched its network in Denmark, Australia and in two US locations – Hawaii and Northern California. The company said it was in talks with more than 25 countries around the world, but only in Israel and Denmark were battery swap stations built. In early 2010, Better Place raised its Series-B round at an amount of $350MM led by new investors from HSBC, Morgan Stanley, and Lazard, as well as all previous investors. In November 2011, the company raised its third equity financing round of $200 million from a group of investors including GE, UBS bank and others.

Agassi was ousted as CEO of Better Place in October 2012. On 26 May 2013, Better Place filed for bankruptcy in the Israeli courts. After spending about US$850 million in private capital, fewer than 1,400 cars had been deployed in Israel. The bankruptcy receivers sold the remaining assets in November 2013 for only $450,000.

== See also ==
- Economy of Israel
- Israeli inventions and discoveries
- Science and technology in Israel
- Start-up Nation: The Story of Israel's Economic Miracle
