= List of embedded CRM systems =

Type of crm software

Embedded customer relationship management software is built-in to an ERP software and can usually not be used as stand-alone CRM software like Salesforce.com. It has the following characteristics:

- functionalities in marketing, sales and service are integral part of the order-to-cash process within an ERP solution
- deep process integration and seamless data flows from marketing, sales and service to invoicing but less feature rich than best-of-breed marketing, sales and service software
- shared master data for customers, contacts, partners, products and prices
- same user interface and application server on the same database for all users

Systems	Company	Price	Deployment / Platform	CRM Features	Integration	Initial Release Year
Acumatica Cloud ERP	Acumatica	Included in base package	SaaS: Public Cloud, Private Cloud Platform: Amazon AWS	Campaign, Target group, Lead; Opportunity, Quote, Order; Support cases, Self-service Portal; Invoice; Customer, Contact, Activity, Analytics	Salesforce, MS Outlook	2008
Epicor ERP	Epicor	Separate price package	SaaS: Public Cloud, Private Cloud On-premises Platform: MS Azure, MS SQL	Lead, Opportunity, Quote, Order; Invoice; Customer, Contact, Interaction, Product Catalog	Salesforce	2008
IFS ERP	IFS	Included in base package	SaaS: Public Cloud	Sales management including opportunities; Configure-to-order, engineer-to-order; Service management, customer projects	Salesforce	2006
IQMS	IQMS	Included in base package	SaaS: Public Cloud On-premises	Campaign, Target group, Lead; Opportunity, Quote, Order; Customer Service Requests, Field Service; Customer, Contact, Partner, Activity, Pricing, Tax, Product Catalog	MS Outlook	1997
MS Dynamics 365 ERP with Dynamics CRM	Microsoft	Separate price package	SaaS: Public Cloud, Private Cloud On-premises Platform: MS Azure	Lead, Opportunity, Quote, Order; Customer service and automation, Field service; Customer, Contact, Partner, Activity, Pricing, Product Catalog, Analytics	MS Outlook, OData	2016
Dynamics Navision	Microsoft	Separate price package	On-premises	Campaign, Target group, Lead; Opportunity, To Dos; Customer Service Requests, Field Service, Service Levels, Warranties; Customer, Contact, Activity, Pricing, Tax, Analytics	ODBC	1996
Netsuite CRM+	Oracle	Separate price package	SaaS: Public Cloud	Campaign, Target group, E-Mail Marketing, Lead; Opportunity, Quote, Order, Delivery; Customer support cases, knowledge base, Customer self-service, B2B E-commerce; Customer, Contact, Partner, Activity, Pricing, Tax, Product Catalog, Analytics	SOAP Interfaces	1987
SAP Business ByDesign	SAP SE	Included in base package	SaaS: Public Cloud, Private Cloud Platform: SAP HANA	Campaign, Target group, E-Mail Marketing, Lead; Opportunity, Quote, Order, Contract, Delivery; Customer Projects, Service Request, Field Service, Return, In-house repair; E-Commerce, Point-of-sales, Over-the-counter sales; Invoice, Credit Memo, Customer Credit; Customer, Contact, Partner, Activity, Pricing, Tax, Product Catalog, Analytics	SOAP and OData Interfaces, Analytics, MS Outlook	2007
SAP S/4HANA	SAP SE	Included in base package	SaaS: Public Cloud, Private Cloud On-premises Platform: SAP HANA	Lead, Opportunity; Inquiry, Quotation, Order, Delivery; Field Service, Return, In-house repair; Invoice, Credit Memo, Customer Credit; Account, Contact, Activity, Pricing, Tax, Product Catalog.	SOAP Interfaces, Analytics	2015

== See also ==
- Customer-relationship management
