= SAP S/4HANA =

Enterprise resource planning by SAP SE

- Developer: SAP SE
- Release: 3 February 2015; 11 years ago
- Written in: ABAP
- Operating system: Windows, macOS, Linux, Unix
- Platform: Cross-platform (on-premises and cloud)
- Predecessor: SAP R/3; SAP ERP
- Available in: Multi-lingual
- Type: Enterprise resource planning
- License: Commercial, proprietary
- Website: www.sap.com/products/erp/s4hana.html

SAP S/4HANA is an enterprise resource planning software for large enterprises developed by SAP SE. It is the successor to both SAP R/3 and SAP ERP, and is optimized for SAP's in-memory database SAP HANA.

== Purpose ==
SAP S/4HANA is an enterprise resource planning (ERP) software package meant to cover all day-to-day processes of an enterprise (for example, order-to-cash, procure-to-pay, plan-to-product, and request-to-service) and core capabilities. It integrates functions from lines of businesses as well as industry solutions, and also re-integrates portions of SAP Business Suite products such as SAP SRM, SAP CRM and SAP SCM. As SAP Business Suite 4 only runs on the SAP HANA database it is packaged as one product: SAP S/4HANA. SAP's classical R3, ERP and ECC based business suite and related products were designed to run on several database platforms, including those from Oracle, Microsoft and IBM.

== History ==
The SAP HANA platform has been available since 2010, and SAP applications like SAP ERP and the SAP Business Suite are able to run on the SAP HANA database and/or other supported database systems.

The new suite, SAP S/4HANA, launched on 3 February 2015 at the New York Stock Exchange. The event introduced cloud and on premises editions, with the on-premises edition becoming available on the same day. The cloud edition went live at SAPPHIRE NOW (SAP’s annual customer conference) on 6 May 2015 in Orlando, Florida.

SAP S/4HANA was called SAP's biggest update to its ERP strategy and platform in over two decades. Post-launch, Gartner analysts noted that SAP S/4HANA represented a "transformational shift," but raised questions about functionality, availability, pricing and migration issues surrounding S/4HANA.

By 21 April 2015, 370 customers had purchased S/4HANA. After the first half of 2015, positive growth was confirmed for SAP. During the third quarter earning calls that took place in October 2015, SAP confirmed that S/4HANA had more than 1,300 customers. By the end of Q4 2016, SAP announced that 5,400 customers had implemented SAP S/4HANA, growing to 8,900 customers by 30 June 2018.

Since its initial release, SAP S/4HANA has continued to evolve through successive versions, each extending the platform’s capabilities in automation, analytics, and cloud integration. Later releases introduced embedded artificial intelligence, predictive insights, and tighter connectivity with the SAP Business Technology Platform (BTP). The roadmap through 2025 emphasizes modular, cloud-native architecture and generative AI integration.

In recent releases, SAP introduced a wide range of application innovations in SAP S/4HANA Cloud Private Edition across all lines of business.

SAP Evolution Summary
Stage	Focus	Transformation Theme
R/3 → ECC	Process automation	Standardization and integration
ECC → S/4HANA	Real-time data	Simplification and speed
S/4HANA 2023 → 2025	Intelligence	AI, cloud, and continuous innovation

=== 2025 updates ===
In 2025, SAP extended the SAP S/4HANA product line with a renewed focus on modularity, automation, and AI-driven operations. The January 2025 Cloud Public Edition (release 2502) introduced embedded generative AI through SAP Joule, enhanced integration with SAP Business Technology Platform, and deeper analytics within the financial core.

2025 release marked a technical and structural realignment of the suite. It consolidated core ERP, finance, and logistics modules under the new SAP Cloud ERP model. This transition moved legacy ECC users closer to a unified, cloud-ready environment without custom extensions that block upgrades.

S/4HANA 2025 introduced a standardized governance layer, improved dependency management, and simplified landscape deployment. The update also improved cross-module traceability, allowing audit and change tracking across distributed systems.

Industry data published by ITAA noted that most ECC systems would reach end of mainstream maintenance by late 2025, accelerating migration projects. At the same time, SAP clarified lifecycle plans extending S/4HANA support until 2040.

The 2025 release cycle also marked a shift in how enterprises approached S/4HANA adoption. Instead of full-scale migrations, many organizations opted for selective data transitions and hybrid deployments to preserve existing investments. SAP introduced refined migration tools and readiness checks, helping teams assess compatibility at the namespace, table, and process level before moving workloads. The shift reflected a practical recognition that most companies operate in mixed environments, combining on-premise systems with cloud extensions and partner-hosted solutions. This approach reduced downtime, lowered project risk, and allowed staged modernization aligned with business cycles rather than forced cutovers.

== Editions and deployment ==
SAP S/4HANA can be deployed on-premises, in the cloud, or through a hybrid model. The S/4HANA product offering consists of various editions: SAP S/4HANA Cloud: previously called essentials edition (ES) and Multi-Tenant Edition, SAP S/4HANA Cloud extended edition: previously called Single-Tenant Edition, SAP S/4HANA Cloud, private edition, SAP S/4HANA On-Premise.

SAP S/4HANA On-Premise is similar in terms of coverage, functionality, industry-specific support, and localization to the current SAP Business Suite (in 39 languages, 64 country versions).

SAP also offers SAP S/4HANA Cloud (in 18 languages, 33 country versions). SAP has emphasized the product as pivotal to its cloud shift.

Both editions consist of functionality for finance, accounting, controlling, procurement, sales, manufacturing, plant maintenance, project system, and product lifecycle management, plus integration with SAP SuccessFactors, SAP Ariba, SAP Hybris, SAP Fieldglass and SAP Concur.

== Overview of releases ==
SAP S/4HANA (on-premises) releases are once per year, SAP S/4HANA Cloud releases are 2 per year. Version coding for cloud edition: YYMM example 1709 - September 2017. Version coding for on-premise edition (since 2020): YYYY example 2020 - Release 2020.

SAP S/4HANA On-Premise releases:

- SAP S/4HANA Finance 1503: March 2015
- SAP S/4HANA 1511: November 2015 - (Component S4CORE 100)
- SAP S/4HANA Finance 1605: May 2016
- SAP S/4HANA 1610: October 2016 - (Component S4CORE 101)
- SAP S/4HANA 1709: September 2017 - (Component S4CORE 102)
- SAP S/4HANA 1809: September 2018 - (Component S4CORE 103)
- SAP S/4HANA 1909: September 2019 - (Component S4CORE 104)
- SAP S/4HANA 2020: October 2020 (new nomenclature: switch to YYYY from YYMM) - (Component S4CORE 105)
- SAP S/4HANA 2021: October 2021 - (Component S4CORE 106)
- SAP S/4HANA 2022: October 2022 - (Component S4CORE 107)
- SAP S/4HANA 2023: October 2023 - (Component S4CORE 108)

SAP S/4HANA Cloud releases:

- SAP S/4HANA Cloud 1603: March 2016
- SAP S/4HANA Cloud 1605: May 2016
- SAP S/4HANA Cloud 1608: August 2016
- SAP S/4HANA Cloud 1611: November 2016
- SAP S/4HANA Cloud 1702: February 2017
- SAP S/4HANA Cloud 1705: May 2017
- SAP S/4HANA Cloud 1708: August 2017
- SAP S/4HANA Cloud 1711: November 2017
- SAP S/4HANA Cloud 1802: February 2018
- SAP S/4HANA Cloud 1805: May 2018
- SAP S/4HANA Cloud 1808: August 2018
- SAP S/4HANA Cloud 1811: November 2018
- SAP S/4HANA Cloud 1902: February 2019
- SAP S/4HANA Cloud 1908: August 2019
- SAP S/4HANA Cloud 1911: November 2019
- SAP S/4HANA Cloud 2002: February 2020
- SAP S/4HANA Cloud 2005: April 2020
- SAP S/4HANA 2008: August 2020
- SAP S/4HANA Cloud 2011: November 2020
- SAP S/4HANA Cloud 2102: February 2021
- SAP S/4HANA Cloud 2105: May 2021
- SAP S/4HANA Cloud 2108: August 2021
- SAP S/4HANA Cloud 2111: November 2021
- SAP S/4HANA Cloud 2202: available February 2022
- SAP S/4HANA Cloud 2208: August 2022
- SAP S/4HANA Cloud 2302: February 2023
- SAP S/4HANA Cloud 2308: August 2023
- SAP S/4HANA Cloud 2402: February 2024
- SAP S/4HANA Cloud 2408: August 2024
- SAP S/4HANA Cloud 2502: February 2025
- SAP S/4HANA Cloud 2508: August 2025
- SAP S/4HANA Cloud 2602: February 2026

== Implementation ==
There are various ways to get to S/4HANA. This depends on a customer’s starting point. For example, new implementation, system conversion, and selective data transition.

- New implementation - This is a new implementation of SAP S/4HANA ("greenfield"): Customers who are migrating from a non-SAP legacy system or from an SAP ERP system and implementing a fresh system that requires an initial data load. In this scenario, the SAP S/4HANA system is implemented, and master and transactional data are migrated from the legacy system, thus standard data migration tools and content has to be used.
- System conversion - This is a complete conversion of an existing SAP Business Suite system to SAP S/4HANA ("brownfield"): Customers who want to change their current SAP ERP system to SAP S/4HANA. This scenario is technically based on Software Update Manager (SUM) with Database Migration Option (DMO) in case the customer is not yet on SAP HANA as the underlying database. Nowadays, companies prefer the brownfield method (system conversion).
- Selective Data Transition (formerly: Landscape Transformation) - This is a consolidation of current regional SAP systems into one global SAP S/4HANA system or a split out of different parts of a system: Customers who want to consolidate their landscape or carve out selected entities (such as a company code) or processes into a single SAP S/4HANA system.

== Product lifecycle ==
Both SAP S/4HANA on-premises and the SAP S/4HANA cloud editions have release strategies. The cloud editions are released semi-annually. The on-premises edition has one new release per year and receives additional functionality and corrections in the form of Feature Pack Stacks (FPS) or Service Pack Stacks (SPS) each quarter.

On-premises: Each year, SAP traditionally shipped a new product version of its on-premises SAP S/4HANA product (e.g., SAP S/4HANA 1610), followed by three successive Feature Pack Stacks (FPS) on a quarterly basis. Subsequently, the previous product version received Service Pack Stacks (SPS) quarterly until the end of mainstream maintenance. However, with the release in October 2023, SAP introduced a significant shift in its release and maintenance strategy for SAP S/4HANA. The product now follows a two-year release cycle, providing a longer seven-year mainstream maintenance period per release. This change aims to offer customers greater opportunities for continuous innovation and a flexible path to cloud readiness. Additionally, more easily adoptable feature packs will be introduced every six months during the first two years of a release, reducing the need for disruptive upgrades and lowering total implementation costs.
