= Tidemark =

- Type: Private
- Founded: 2010; 16 years ago
- Founder: Christian Gheorghe; Tony Rizzo; Nenshad Bardoliwalla
- Headquarters: Redwood City, California
- Products: Enterprise software, Data analytics
- Number of employees: 150+

Tidemark is a private enterprise performance management firm founded in 2010 that provides cloud-based analytics applications built for a mobile device enabled platform. Tidemark was known as Proferi when it was in stealth mode and is located in Redwood City, California. In Sept. 2013, Tidemark won the Big Data Startup Challenge and earned a spot in the Big Data 50.

== Company history ==
Founded by Christian Gheoghe with co-founders Tony Rizzo and Nenshad Bardoliwalla in 2010, Tidemark's approach to EPM analytics emphasizes a mobile first user experience in a public multi-tenant cloud. Gheorghe and Rizzo spent 9 months surveying Fortune 1000 companies before they developed Tidemark's product range asking businesses how to improve existing intelligence and analytics solutions.

Gheorghe previously created Tian Software which was bought out by OutlookSoft. Gheorghe served as CTO of OutlookSoft until the firm was acquired by SAP AG and was kept on board as a Senior Vice-president and CTO at SAP AG.

After two years in stealth mode, Tidemark raised $6.3 million in Series A funding. This was followed by $4 million in Series B funding, $24 million in Series C funding, and $13 million in Series D funding. Key investors include Greylock Partners, Andreessen Horowitz, Tenaya Capital, Redpoint Ventures and Dave Duffield.

Companies utilizing Tidemark's analytics services include Orange, La Quinta Inns & Suites, Brown University, and Stanford University.

In 2015, Tidemark announced $25 million from a new round of funding, led by Workday. The company has raised over $100 million in total funding. Tidemark's customer-base grew 4x during 2015 with clients such as Veolia, Stanford University, Intuit, G6 Hospitality, Bluelink and the University of Miami.

In 2015, Tidemark was placed on Gartner’s Magic Quadrant in the 'Visionaries' Quadrant for corporate performance and Business Insider named Tidemark as one of the Top 50 enterprise startups to bet your career on in 2016.

On July 6, 2017, Tidemark merged with Longview, a Toronto-based finance and tax performance management software company.

== Products ==
Tidemark offers three apps that let users access real-time risk-adjusted data metrics, profitability modeling, and other tools for strategic, financial, and operational planning. The firm's performance management platform is enabled for any device compatible with HTML5.

The firm also offers Storylines, a SaaS product presenting structured and unstructured data in a series of infographic-like images giving users an interactive and detailed view of a company's operations.

In 2014, Tidemark added financial playbooks and predictive analytics functions to its software. The predictive analytics incorporates big data and social media information for use in forecasting and budgeting. The company was recognized with two Cloud Computing Product of the Year awards presented by Cloud Computing Magazine in December 2014.
