= ECATT =

Software testing tool

eCATT (extended Computer Aided Test Tool) is a tool for software test automation developed by SAP. eCATT offers a graphical user interface with ABAP script editor and its own command syntax. The capability for recording and for parameterizing the test components is also present.
