= SAP IS-U =

SAP IS-U is SAP's industry-specific solution for the utilities industry. SAP IS-U is a sales and information system that supports utility and waste disposal companies.

SAP IS-U supports business functions such as meter reading, meter data management, scheduling, billing, invoicing, accounting, customer service, and integration to customer relations management. This component can manage and bill customers who receive services, purchase goods, or pay fees and taxes.

SAP IS-U helps electric, gas, and water utilities of all sizes in regulated, transitioning or deregulated markets. It offers management of business processes to help utilities gain visibility for better decision-making and responsiveness to market demands. SAP IS-U is an integrated component of SAP enterprise software, and uses functions of the mySAP standard components FI, CO, AM, SD, PM/SM, and MM. SAP IS-U.

Traditionally, electricity networks operated using a one-way distribution model in which electricity flowed from centralized power plants to consumers. The increasing adoption of distributed energy resources (DER), including rooftop solar photovoltaic systems, battery energy storage, and electric vehicles, has introduced bidirectional energy flows. Consumers can also become "prosumers" by supplying excess electricity back to the grid. This transition requires utilities to support dynamic billing, smart metering, and near real-time energy data processing to accurately measure both electricity consumption and energy exported to the grid.

Traditional on-premise systems are being replaced by modular, cloud-based architectures under SAP S/4HANA Utilities to manage complex decentralized networks like SAP Distributed Energy Resources / DER, helping utilities handle energy generated by prosumers.

The SAP Green Ledger and Sustainability Control Tower calculate carbon flows across the grid, allowing utilities to submit well-audited environmental records to the government.

With the help of SAP Joule, customer service and finance teams can handle complex grid-data queries, documents, and audit logs using simple language rather than navigating complex transaction codes.
