= SAP Graphical User Interface =

Component of SAP systems

SAP GUI
- SAP GUI for Windows version 6.40
- Developer: SAP
- Stable release: 8.10 / July 16, 2026; 3 months ago
- Written in: C, C++
- Operating system: Microsoft Windows, Java virtual machine

SAP GUI is the graphical user interface client in SAP ERP's 3-tier architecture of database, application server and client. It is software that runs on a Microsoft Windows, Apple Macintosh or Unix desktop, and allows a user to access SAP functionality in SAP applications such as SAP ERP and SAP Business Information Warehouse (BW). It is used for remote access to the SAP central server in a company network.

== Family ==
- SAP GUI for the Windows environment and Apple Macintosh
- SAP GUI for the Java(TM) environment
- SAP GUI for HTML / Internet Transaction Server (ITS)

== Microsoft Windows releases ==
Release	Release date	Latest patch	End of life	Features
1.0				First "GUI" for SAP software; no graphical elements like checkboxes, radiobuttons and icons
1.1				Field length indicated by background colors; fast paths in menus
2.0				New GUI for Windows 3.1; System and Application Toolbar added; icons in System Toolbar
2.1				New graphical elements: checkboxes, radiobuttons, group boxes and push buttons on screen
3.0				Table control introduced; icons added to buttons
3.1	1996			Windows95-look with flat buttons; tabstrip control and ABAP List Viewer (ALV) introduced
4.0				Screens contain more information to reduce navigation
4.5				Active X elements introduced; ALV is now based on grid control
4.6D	July 2000			GUI is re-designed; multiple-areas are introduced to reduce need for screen changes
6.10	July 2001			
6.20	March 2002		December 31, 2010	Scripting added
6.40	June 2004		December 31, 2010	Unicode support extended; accessibility and usability improved
7.10	February 2007		April 12, 2011	Support for Microsoft Vista and Office 2007; new "Tweak SAP GUI" tool; new ABAP front-end editor
7.20	April 2010	17 (final)	April 09, 2013	Support for Windows XP; Windows 2003 Server; Windows Vista; Windows 2008 Server; Windows 7 and Office 2010; Built with Visual Studio 2008
7.30	June 2012	15	July 15, 2015	Usability enhancements; new customization features; built with Visual Studio 2010
7.40	October 2014	19	November 9, 2019	Replaces Corbu with Blue Crystal; integrates SAP GUI for Windows 7.40 and Netweaver Business Client 5.0
7.50	May 2017	15 (final)	April 9, 2019	
7.60	February 2019	15	April 12, 2022	Introduces Belize theme, aligning GUI's visual design with the rest of SAP's Fiori applications. Retires Enjoy / Streamline / Tradeshow / SystemDependent themes.
7.70	January 29, 2021	16	April 09, 2024	
8.00	January 27, 2023	19	January 12, 2027	The 64bit version; Quartz themes: Modernization of rendering engine and some additional features; HTML Control based on Microsoft Edge: Improvements; Usability improvements in many components; Improvements for SAP Logon; Branding images per system and client
8.10	July 16, 2026	01	June 30, 2029	Introduces Horizon and Horizon Dark themes; Custom Theming; HTML Control based on Microsoft Edge (WebView2); keyboard handling, accessibility and usability improvements; configuration file caching; SAP Joule Frontend Actions integration; built with Visual Studio 2026. SAP first introduced SAP GUI for Windows 8.10 through a public Beta Program in November 2025, giving customers an early look at the upcoming enhancements before the general availability release.

== Java releases – for other operating systems ==
Release	Release date	Latest patch
7.10	October 31, 2007	11
7.20	December 22, 2009	10
7.30	December 10, 2012	10
7.40	December 5, 2014	13
7.50	August 14, 2017	15
7.70	March 16, 2021	9
7.80	September 19, 2022	10
8.10	October 14, 2024	14

== Single sign-on ==
SAP GUI on Microsoft Windows or Internet Explorer can also be used for single sign-on. There are several portal-based authentication applications for single sign-on. SAP GUI can have single sign-on with SAP Logon Ticket as well. Single sign-on also works in the Java GUI.

=== Criticism of using SAP GUI for authentication to SAP server access ===
SAP is a distributed application, where client software (SAP GUI) installed on a user's workstation is used to access the central SAP server remotely over the company's network. Users need to authenticate themselves when accessing SAP. By default, however, SAP uses unencrypted communication, which allows potential company-internal attackers to get access to usernames and passwords by listening on the network. This can expose the complete SAP system, if a person is able to get access to this information for a user with extended authorization in the SAP system. Information about this feature is publicly accessible on the Internet.

=== SAP Secure Network Communications ===
SAP offers an option to strongly protect communication between clients and servers, called Secure Network Communications (SNC).

== Security ==
In total, the vendor has released 25 security patches (aka SAP Security Notes). One of the most notorious vulnerabilities was closed among the set of fixes released in March 2017. The vulnerability in the SAP GUI client for Windows allows remote code execution. Also, researchers who identified the security issues pointed out that the vulnerability allows an attacker to download ransomware on the SAP server that would be automatically installed on every workstation within a company.

== Screen editing with Personas ==
Since 1998 SAP GUI screens (so-called "DynPros") can be adjusted and customized with GuiXT. Now this can also be achieved with "SAP Screen Personas". Personas is installed on one of the SAP NetWeaver ABAP 7.0x or 7.3x servers in the system landscape. Then it can be used on all SAP NetWeaver ABAP servers with a kernel of 7.21 or higher, including on NetWeaver ABAP 7.11 systems (on which Personas cannot be installed directly).

== iOS and Android implementations ==
Native iOS and Android implementations of SAP GUI are available from GuiXT.

== See also ==
- Public key infrastructure
- Single sign-on
- Secure Network Communications
- Smartcard
