= XApps =

xApp (SAP AG Composite Application), is a collective term applied to software products built following the SAP xApps convention and running on a SAP NetWeaver application server. Including a range of software products from SAP AG, solutions by SAP partners and customer made composite applications. xApps are commonly targeted at specific industries or are geared towards vertical applications common across a range of industries. xApps typically have a smaller footprint than some of the company's other business applications such as MySAP. xApp is the general term for applications based on the SAP ESOA, i.e. applications using SAP enterprise SOA services.

As of October 2006, SAP offered xApps targeted at Product lifecycle management, supply chain management, manufacturing intelligence and other areas.

Example xApps provided by SAP include:

- SAP xApp Cost and Quotation Management (SAP xCQM) - allows alignment of disparate functions of design, sourcing, and costing to enable profitable decision making
- SAP xApp Integrated Exploration and Production (SAP xIEP) - an enterprise-wide operating environment to optimize the exploration and production (E&P) life cycle
- SAP xApp Manufacturing Integration and Intelligence (SAP xMII) - Connects manufacturing with enterprise business processes, providing information to improve production performance
- SAP xApp Product Definition (SAP xPD) - helps translate ideas into successful and innovative products
- SAP xApp Resource and Portfolio Management (SAP xRPM) - improves portfolio performance and aligns it with organizational objectives for new product development, IT, Six Sigma, and services across an enterprise

SAP xApps are composite applications which can combine Web services and data from multiple systems. The application architecture is defined by the SAP Composite Application Framework within the SAP NetWeaver platform. The framework includes the methodology, tools, and run-time environment to develop composite applications. It provides a consistent object model and allows developers to build composite applications with a rich user interface, which can access multiple other heterogeneous applications via services.
