= Order to cash =

Top-level business processes

Order to cash (O2C) refers to one of the top-level (context level) business processes for receiving and processing customer orders and revenue recognition. Order to cash is an essential function in finance; the entire cycle of events happens after a customer places an order until the customer pays for the order; that is, the order is converted to cash.

== History ==
Beginning in the mid 2000s as more mid-size and large firms began to adopt enterprise systems, the science of business processes, manufacturing processes, and finance began to develop and proliferate to more industries and companies. Business process reengineering became more common, and enterprise architectures and IT systems were aligned. Hence, the jargon of many other "top-level business processes" became more common.

These included:

- marketing to lead
- opportunity to order
- procure-to-pay (P2P)
- issue to complete (for manufacturing production)
- hire to retire
- concept to launch (for innovation and new product development)
- sustain and retain (for customer service and support)
- record to report for general ledger processes.

Later, the concept of order-to-cash was extended to "Lead to Cash" by many software providers to include also the marketing and pre-sales process steps.

In many business models, a contractual relationship is established first via a Contract or Subscription. Orders are then received via different sales channels, such as by phone, fax, email, internet or salesperson. The contractual relationship would be confirmed, and the orders are fulfilled through shipping and logistics. On completion of key events, an invoice is generated and booked as Sales (subject to "revenue recognition" requirements). If payment has not already been received, the debt is recorded and pursued through dunning cycles until the funds are received. Order to Cash is completed by the customer care and field service and repair process (inquiries, requests and complaints).

== In ERP software ==
All enterprise resource planning (ERP) systems provide order to cash processes. Examples are Microsoft Dynamics 365, Oracle Cloud ERP, Oracle NetSuite, SAP ERP SD, SAP Business ByDesign or Workday. Typical sub-processes and variants in those ERP systems are:

- Customer master data entry
- Lead management, opportunity management and quotation management
- Order and contract entry (creation, availability check and booking)
- Order fulfillment (physical and digital fulfillment)
- Distribution
- Invoicing
- Customer payments / collection
- Cash application
- Deductions (if invoice short paid by customer)
- Collections

== Quote to cash ==
Quote to Cash (Q2C) refers to all the business processes involved in O2C, customer purchase intent, configuration pricing quoting, and contract lifecycle management.

== See also ==
- Customer relationship management
- List of embedded CRM systems
