= SAP Business Explorer =

- Developer(s): SAP SE
- Written in: ABAP
- Available in: Multi-lingual
- License: Proprietary
- Website: https://help.sap.com/doc/saphelp_nw73ehp1/7.31.19/en-US/5b/30d43b0527a17be10000000a114084/frameset.htm

SAP Business Explorer is a tool of the software company SAP SE to create planning applications, and for planning and data entry in BW Integrated Planning.

== Architecture ==
The architecture of SAP Business Explorer can be separated into 3 areas:

Ad-hoc Query and Analyse
This mainly consists Web Analyzer.
Reporting and Analyse Design
Main components are Web Application Designer and Report Designer.
Microsoft Excel Integration
This consists Analyser (Add-in).

== See also ==
- SAP NetWeaver Application Server
