= SAP CRM =

CRM technology software

- SAP CRM home screen
- Developer: SAP SE
- Release: 1992; 34 years ago
- Stable release: EHP 4 (v7.0) / 2009; 17 years ago
- Operating system: Windows, macOS, Linux, Unix
- Platform: Cross-platform software (SAP C/4HANA Cloud-based)
- Available in: Multilingual
- Type: Customer relationship management
- License: Commercial, Proprietary
- Website: SAP CRM

The SAP CRM applications were initially integrated on-premises customer relationship management (CRM) software manufactured by SAP SE which targeted business software requirements for marketing, sales and service for midsize and large organizations in all industries and sectors. The first SAP CRM release 2.0 has been made generally available in November 2000. The current release 7.0 has been updated with quarterly enhancement packs (EHPs) since 2009.

In 2007 SAP started to develop a cloud based CRM which has been renamed from SAP Business ByDesign CRM to Sales on Demand to SAP Cloud for Customer and finally to SAP Cloud for Sales. Since 2018 SAP has consolidated all of its cloud based marketing, sales, service and commerce applications as SAP C/4HANA suite.

== Overview ==
After the acquisition of Hybris in 2013, SAP has gradually realigned their CRM strategy mainly to take on the market leader Salesforce.com which is a cloud-based software. In a bid to be more competitive and future focused, SAP has been shifting towards cloud based CRM applications since 2011 rather than traditional on-premises software. Still SAP CRM is being used by thousands of companies and there are according to SAP no plans to sunset the product.

SAP has consolidated its CRM applications under the terms "Customer Engagement and Commerce" (CEC) and since 2018 under "Customer Experience" (CX). SAP offers a variety of (partially acquired) applications.

== History ==
SAP started working on CRM related capabilities in the early 1990s as embedded CRM modules of the SAP R/3 ERP. The "Sales and Distribution" (SD) module of SAP R/3 ERP covered functionalities for:

- Customer management and Product catalog (MM).
- Pre-sales actions for inquiry, activities and quotation management.
- Sales order and delivery management
- Pricing, tax and billing including credit management

SAP offered its first stand-alone CRM software in 2000. The initial release of "SAP CRM" 2.0 had been pushed by the acquisition of the German salesforce automation specialist Kiefer & Veittinger with its "Mobile Sales" application.

In parallel to the new focus for stand-alone SAP CRM, SAP continued to invest in the embedded CRM scenarios as part of its ERP software in 2005. This allowed SAP in 2007 to copy the CRM codeline from the newly developed cloud ERP SAP Business ByDesign and to create the independent "Cloud for Sales" and "Cloud for Service" applications (also known as "Cloud for Customer"). Another example for this copy and paste approach was the decision to move the SAP CRM codelines for service and sales into the S/4HANA ERP which allowed SAP to offer the new "S/4HANA for Customer Management" option.

Major milestones of the SAP CRM development:

- SAP R/3 Sales and Distribution (SD) was initially released as part of R/3 Enterprise Edition 1.0 A in 1992
- SAP CRM 2000 (2.0) initially released in 2000
- SAP CRM 2006 (5.0) released in 2005
- SAP CRM 2007 (6.0) released in 2007
- SAP CRM 2008 (7.0) released in 2009 as Part of SAP Business Suite 7.0
- SAP Business ByDesign Cloud ERP including CRM initially released in 2007
- SAP Cloud for Customer initially released in 2011
- Hybris acquisition in 2013 and afterwards renaming of its CRM portfolio to SAP Hybris Customer Engagement and Commerce in 2014
- CallidusCloud (CPQ, Sales Enablement) and Coresystems (Field Service) acquisition in 2018
- Introduction of SAP S/4HANA for Customer Management in 2018 which added the SAP CRM 7.0 service and sales capabilities to S/4HANA ERP core
- SAP C/4HANA Customer Experience announced 2018. SAP C/4HANA is an umbrella term for SAP's combined customer experience products.

== See also ==
- List of SAP products
