= SAP BusinessObjects Lumira =

SAP Lumira
- Developer: SAP
- Initial release: 12 May 2012; 13 years ago
- Stable release: 2.4, 2025 / 15 July 2020; 5 years ago
- Operating system: Windows; Linux
- Type: Business Intelligence
- License: Trialware
- Website: sap.com

SAP BusinessObjects Lumira, also known as SAP Lumira or simply Lumira, is business intelligence software developed and marketed by SAP. The software is used to manipulate and visualize data.

== History ==
Lumira was initially launched as SAP Visual Intelligence in 2012. The first edition of the software could only use SAP's HANA platform as a data source. The second release expanded data sources to include CSV and Excel files. In 2013, SAP rebranded the software under the Lumira name and began offering a version of the software as a cloud computing program. In 2015, the cloud version of Lumira was absorbed into SAP's Cloud for Analytics software (now known as SAP Analytics Cloud), while the Lumira Server and Lumira Desktop software remained separate.

In 2016, Lumira 2.x was announced. It rebranded the original Lumira Desktop as SAP Lumira Discovery and rebranded SAP Design Studio as SAP Lumira Designer. Lumira 2.x was unique, in that a business user could develop a simple dashboard using SAP Lumira Discovery then hand off the dashboard to a developer, who could add more sophistication and custom code using SAP Lumira Designer. But starting with Lumira 2.4, introduced in August 2020, SAP froze innovation and positioned SAP Analytics Cloud as the successor to SAP Lumira.

SAP BusinessObjects Business Intelligence 2025 was released on March 12, 2025, and is the first version of the suite that drops support for SAP Lumira Discovery. However, it will continue to support SAP Lumira Designer 2025, which is expected in Q1-2026.

== See also ==
- BusinessObjects
- SAP SE
