= SAP Business ByDesign =

Technology company

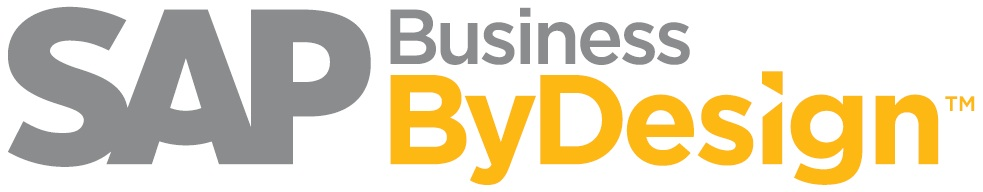
Logo of SAP Business ByDesign

SAP Business ByDesign (ByD) is a cloud enterprise resource planning software (Cloud ERP) that is sold and operated as software as a service by SAP SE. It is designed for small and medium-sized enterprises. The software is designed to provide business processes across application areas from financials to human resources with embedded business analytics, mobility, e-learning, and support.

SAP Business ByDesign is built on the principles of a service oriented architecture (SOA). Integration between business capabilities is accomplished via messages. The underlying technology stack is a multi-tenancy enabled SAP NetWeaver stack, leveraging SAP's in-memory HANA database.

SAP Business ByDesign is used by almost 10.000 companies in more than 140 countries and supports 41 languages (13 standard and 28 partner translated, including simplified Chinese, Japanese, Korean, Polish, Hebrew). It is localized for 65 countries (standard localizations, pre-localizations and partner localizations). In addition customers and partners can create custom country and language versions using the Localization and Language Toolkit provided by SAP. Examples for the 72 localizations by customers or partners are Taiwan, Malaysia, Vietnam, Chile and Peru.

== Business areas and scenarios ==
SAP Business ByDesign processes are grouped by application areas interlinked by so-called business scenarios. Scenarios provide business processes which span across companies, partners, departments and its employees. The main application areas and core business scenarios are:

- Financial management (FIN): Cash and Liquidity Management, Financial Closing, Fixed Asset Management
- Customer relationship management (CRM): Marketing to Opportunity, Field Service and Repair, Order to cash (projects, standard service, materials)
- Project management and professional service automation (PSA / PRO): Project Management
- Supplier relationship management and procurement (SRM): Procure to pay (stock and non stock)
- Supply chain management (SCM): Demand Planning, Strategic sourcing, Make to stock, Physical Inventory Management,
- Human resources management (HRM): Expense Reimbursement, Resource Management, Time and Labor Management
- Business analytics (BA or BI)
- Executive support and compliance management.

== History ==
SAP announced SAP Business ByDesign on 19 September 2007 during an event in New York. It was previously known under the code name "A1S". Since its initial and general available release in 2007 (so-called feature pack 1.2) it has been enhanced in quarterly releases.

By 2022 it was announced that SAP intended to terminate SAP Business ByDesign. SAP officially denied this rumor and published an announcement in December, 2022, to partners including this quote: "SAP Business ByDesign is a globally recognized cloud ERP software solution available to the market - without an expiry date. It can be purchased and implemented by SAP or through our partners"

== See also ==
- Cloud computing
- Comparison of accounting software
- Customer relationship management
- List of ERP software packages
- List of embedded CRM
- List of SAP products
- Project management
- Supply chain management
