= IQMS =

Technology company

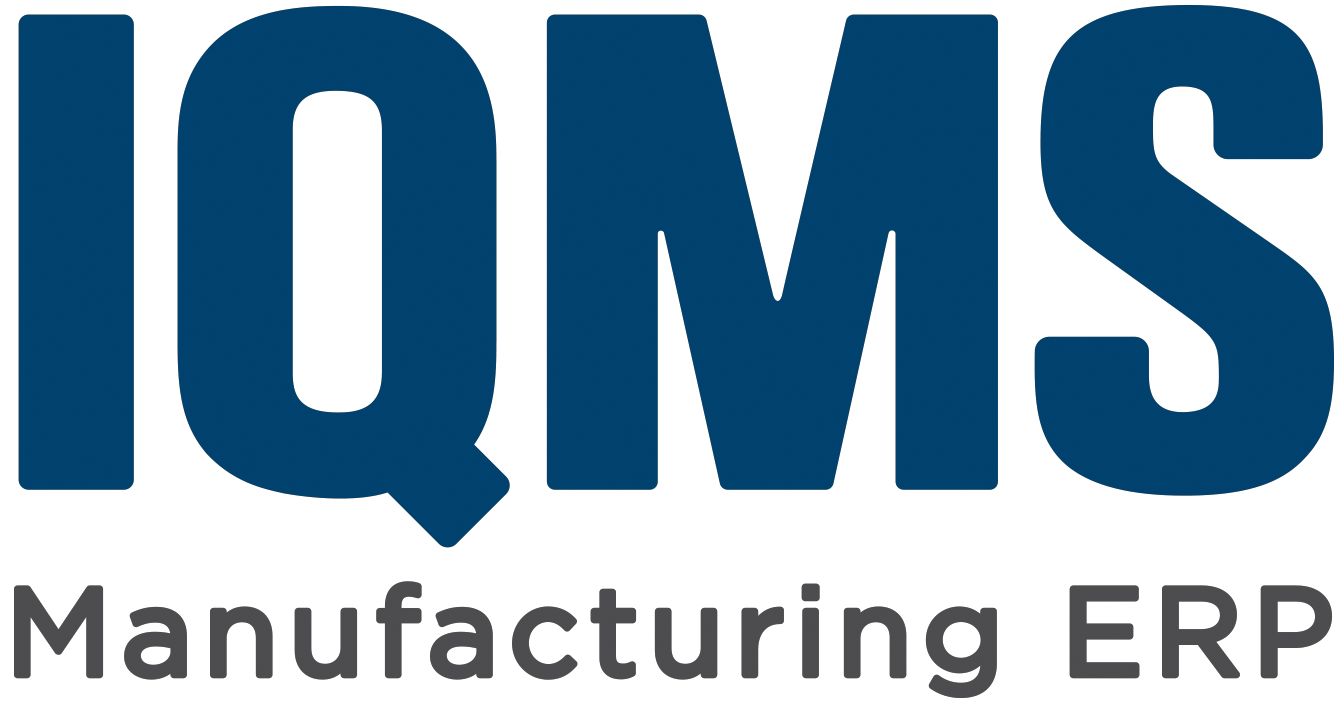
- Type: Private
- Industry: Computer Software
- Founded: 1989
- Founders: Randy Flamm and Nancy Flamm
- Defunct: 2019
- Fate: Acquired by Dassault Systèmes; portfolio rebranded as DELMIAWorks
- Headquarters: Paso Robles, California, United States
- Area served: Worldwide
- Key people: Cheri Williams (CEO)
- Products: Enterprise resource planning software
- Services: Manufacturing, accounting, production monitoring, quality control, supply chain management, CRM, and eBusiness solutions
- Revenue: $53.5 million (2016)
- Number of employees: 312 (2018)
- Website: www.iqms.com

IQMS (also known as DELMIAWorks) was a privately held, global software company based in Paso Robles, California. The company developed and marketed manufacturing ERP and real time manufacturing execution systems to the automotive, medical, packaging, consumer goods, aerospace, defense and other manufacturing industries. IQMS has been included on Inc. Magazine's list of the 5000 fastest growing privately held U.S. companies from 2011 through 2016. Gary Nemmers became the CEO of IQMS in 2015, and was succeeded by Cheri Williams in 2020.

== History ==
IQMS was founded by Randy and Nancy Flamm in 1989 and began with a Microsoft DOS-based offering named IQGenesis. IQMS moved its headquarters from Southern California to Paso Robles in 1995. In 1997, the company developed EnterpriseIQ, a manufacturing ERP software for the repetitive, process, and discrete manufacturing industries. In 2011, IQMS product EnterpriseIQ 7.8.1 won the Stevie Award for "New Product or Service of the Year - Manufacturing". In 2012, the company introduced the RTStation, a touch-screen device engineered for at-machine use providing shop floor functionality. In August 2015, Nemmers succeeded Flamm as CEO while Flamm remained chairman of the board of directors.

In April 2016, the company announced a browser-based user interface for its EnterpriseIQ Manufacturing ERP system named WebIQ. In September 2016, the company announced the ability for clients to automatically back up their IQMS system data in secure offsite data storage locations. That month, the company also partnered with the Community Foundation San Luis Obispo County to provide two students entering college in the STEM field with a $20 thousand scholarship.

In 2017, IQMS was awarded a gold Stevie Award in the customer service team of the year category, and the executive of the year category, as well as a silver in the large computer software company of the year category.

In early 2019, Dassault Systèmes acquired IQMS for $425 million. As part of the acquisition, Dassault Systèmes rebranded the IQMS portfolio to DELMIAWorks.

== Overview ==
IQMS provided real-time manufacturing, production monitoring, quality control, supply chain management, customer relationship management and e-business solutions through ERP and other software for the automotive, medical, plastics and general manufacturing industries. The company's solution was deployed as an on-premise, or cloud-based and supports the Linux, Microsoft Windows and Unix operating systems.

The company was headquartered in California with offices across North America, Europe, and Asia.

== See also ==
- List of ERP software packages
