= SAP R/2 =

Defunct mainframe-based ERP software suite

SAP R/2 is an older version of real-time enterprise resource planning (ERP) software produced by the German company SAP AG, that was replaced by SAP R/3.

SAP R/2 was launched in 1979 and followed the company's first product, a materials management module called RM/1, which was launched in 1975 and became part of R/1. What was unique about R/2 was that it was a packaged software application that processed real-time on a mainframe computer taking advantage of Time Sharing Option and integrated all of an enterprise's functions, such as accounting, manufacturing processes, supply chain logistics and human resources.

The modules of R/2 included: RF (Finance) / RK (Controlling) (current day FICO), RM (Materials Management - including Purchasing (RM-PUR), Inventory Management, Production Planning, Quality Management (RM-Qualitäts), Plant Maintenance (RM-INST); RV (including Sales & Distribution and modern-day Logistics Execution);RK-P (Projects) RP (Personnel).

== See also ==
- SAP ERP
