= CallidusCloud =

US enterprise software and SaaS company

Callidus Software Inc.
- Formerly: CallidusCloud
- Type: Subsidiary
- Industry: Enterprise software
- Founded: 1996; 30 years ago
- Headquarters: Dublin, California, U.S.
- Services: Enterprise software Software as a service Cloud computing
- Revenue: ▲$ $253,091 thousand (2017)
- Parent: SAP
- Website: calliduscloud.com
- Footnotes; As of May 2017.

Callidus Software Inc., formerly CallidusCloud, is an enterprise software and software as a service (SaaS) company headquartered in Dublin, California. The company markets services for sales effectiveness, sales management and sales execution (CPQ, CLM) software and services. It is a part of the SAP Sales Cloud.

== History ==
Callidus Software Inc. was incorporated in Delaware on September 6, 1996 by founders Andrew Swett and Scott Kitayama to provide Enterprise Incentive Management (EIM) application systems. Initial funding came from Onset Ventures.

In November 2003, the company had its Initial public offering on the Nasdaq National Market under the stock symbol CALD, raising US$70 million. The company was delisted in 2018 after its acquisition.

Robert Youngjohns was appointed CEO in April 2005.

Leslie James Stretch was appointed CEO at the end of 2007. Stretch led the company for 11 years through the transition to Saas and subsequent sale to SAP in 2018. After acquiring Litmos in June 2011, Callidus Cloud adopted the name Litmos.

LeadFormix was acquired in January 2012. The company acquired Datahug in November 2016.

On January 30, 2018, it was announced that the company SAP had acquired CallidusCloud for $2.4 billion. After being acquired by SAP in 2019, the product's name changed again to SAP Litmos. Litmos was sold by SAP in 2022.

== Products and services ==
CallidusCloud provides Software as a Service (SaaS) products for marketing and sales effectiveness. This includes applications to identify business leads, ensure proper territory and quota distribution, enable sales forces, as well as other features. The company offers applications for customer satisfaction monitoring, sales gamification, and a learning management system including content authoring system. Callidus' partner companies include Adobe, Accenture, SpectrumTek and Canidium LLC.
