= Hybris (company) =

German e-commerce software company

- Industry: Enterprise omnichannel commerce software, product information management, master data management, mobile commerce and e-commerce consulting
- Founded: 1997
- Founders: Carsten Thoma; Moritz Zimmermann; Klaas Hermanns; Christian Flaccus; Andreas Bucksteeg
- Headquarters: Munich, Germany
- Area served: Global
- Website: https://www.sap.com/uk/products/acquired-brands/what-is-hybris.html

Hybris (stylised as hybris) was a German software company that developed enterprise e-commerce and omnichannel commerce platforms, along with product content management (PCM) and master data management tools. Founded in 1997, it was acquired by SAP SE in 2013 for approximately $1.5 billion and subsequently integrated into SAP's customer experience portfolio as SAP Commerce Cloud.

== History ==
Hybris was founded in Zug, Switzerland, in 1997 by Carsten Thoma, Moritz Zimmermann, Klaas Hermanns, Christian Flaccus and Andreas Bucksteeg. The company subsequently moved its headquarters to Munich, Germany, and grew to serve large enterprises requiring multi-channel commerce infrastructure.

In 2011, private equity firm HGGC acquired a majority stake in Hybris and merged Canadian software company iCongo into it, expanding its capabilities in product information management.

In March 2013, the company raised $30 million in a funding round led by Meritech Capital and Greylock Partners. SAP SE acquired Hybris on 1 August 2013 for approximately $1.5 billion. In 2018, the Hybris platform was integrated into SAP's Customer Experience division and rebranded as SAP Commerce Cloud.

Hybris customers included General Electric, ABB, West Marine, COS, Thomson Reuters, 3M, Toys "R" Us, Procter & Gamble, Levi Strauss & Co., Nikon and Johnson & Johnson.
