= SAP NetWeaver Portal =

SAP NetWeaver Portal is one of the building blocks in the SAP NetWeaver architecture. With a Web Browser, users can begin work once they have been authenticated in the portal which offers a single point of access to information, enterprise applications, and services both inside and outside an organization. The portal provides access to business processes and information, social collaboration and content management across various consumption channels.

== Development ==
Following the SAP strategy, SAP NetWeaver Portal is also available on mobile devices. It is also planned to consume on demand and cloud portal services leveraging services of the in-memory computation engine (HANA).

== Authentication ==
SAP NetWeaver Portal allows different forms of authentication:

- username and password
- SAP Logon Tickets
- Assertion Ticket
- X.509 certificates (i.e., Single Sign-On) via Secure Network Communications or Secure Sockets Layer
- Client Certificate

== Criticism ==
Analyst firm Real Story Group chronicled SAP Portal's slow embrace of Web 2.0 technologies, such as wikis. Real Story Group customer research also compared NetWeaver Portal somewhat unfavorably to competing offerings.

== See also ==
- X.509
- SAP Logon Ticket
- Single Sign-On
- Secure Network Communications
- Secure Sockets Layer
- SAP
