= OutlookSoft =

OutlookSoft Corporation
- Type: Subsidiary
- Industry: Enterprise software
- Fate: Acquired
- Successor: SAP (SAP Analytics Cloud)
- Products: Business Performance Management software (SAP BPC)
- Parent: SAP AG (acquired 2007)

OutlookSoft Corporation was a Stamford, Connecticut based software company with products for business performance management including planning, consolidation, forecasting, budgeting, dashboards, predictive analytics and reporting. Along with OutlookSoft, other vendors in the performance management space include SAS, Cognos (acquired by IBM in 2008), Business Objects (acquired by SAP AG in 2007) and Hyperion Solutions Corporation (acquired by Oracle in 2007).

In 2006, OutlookSoft was named in the top 25% in Deloitte's Technology Fast 500, and in the same year, was sued by competitor, Hyperion, over software patents, winning a dismissal in October 2006 as the jury found no patent infringement and subsequently ruled the patents ineligible for claim. In June 2007, SAP AG announced its proposed acquisition of OutlookSoft, as a part of its strategy to challenge Oracle Corporation. Although the purchase price was never disclosed, estimates placed it between $200 and $400 million.

SAP acquired OutlookSoft in 2007, with the terms of the deal remaining undisclosed. OutlookSoft's largest product was revamped as SAP BPC (Business Planning and Consolidation) after acquisition by SAP AG.

SAP Analytics Cloud (SAC) is now the successor to SAP BPC.
