= SAP NetWeaver Business Warehouse =

SAP Business Warehouse (SAP BW) is SAP’s Enterprise Data Warehouse product. It can transform and consolidate business information from virtually any source system. It ran on industry standard RDBMS until version 7.3 at which point it began to transition onto SAP's HANA in-memory DBMS, particularly with the release of version 7.4.

Latterly, it evolved into a product called BW/4HANA so as to align with SAP's sister ERP Product called S/4HANA. This strategy allowed SAP to engineer the database to use the HANA in-Memory database. Consequently, this facilitates the push down of complex OLAP based functions to the database as opposed to NetWeaver ABAP Application Server to improve performance. The product is also more open and can incorporate SAP and Non-SAP data more easily.

== History ==
In 1998 SAP released the first version of SAP BW, providing a model-driven approach to EDW that made data warehousing easier and more efficient, particularly for SAP R/3 data. Since then, SAP BW has evolved to become a key component for thousands of companies. An article, provided the history of SAP BW from inception to the newer releases powered by SAP HANA.
