= SAP Business Suite =

SAP Business Suite is a bundle of business applications that provide integration of information and processes, collaboration, industry-specific functionality and scalability. SAP Business Suite is based on SAP's technology platform called NetWeaver.

SAP Business Suite 7 has five constituents:

- SAP ERP 6.0 (Enterprise Resource Planning)
- SAP CRM 7.0 (Customer Relationship Management)
- SAP SRM 7.0 (Supplier Relationship Management)
- SAP SCM 7.0 (Supply Chain Management)
- SAP PLM 7.0 (Product Lifecycle Management)
