= SAP ERP =

German enterprise resource planning software

ERP
- Developer: SAP SE
- Release: 1972; 54 years ago
- Stable release: SAP R/3 (v6.0) / 2016; 10 years ago
- Written in: C, C++, ABAP/4
- Operating system: Windows, macOS, Linux, Unix
- Platform: Cross-platform (on-premises)
- Predecessor: SAP R/3
- Successor: SAP S/4HANA
- Available in: Over 50 languages
- Type: Enterprise resource planning
- License: Commercial, proprietary
- Website: sap.com/erp

SAP ERP is enterprise resource planning software developed by the European company SAP SE. SAP ERP incorporates the key business functions of an organization. The latest version of SAP ERP (V.6.0) was made available in 2006. The most recent SAP enhancement package 8 for SAP ERP 6.0 was released in 2016. It is now considered legacy technology, having been superseded by SAP S/4HANA.

== Functionality ==
Business processes included in SAP ERP are:

- Operations (sales & distribution, materials management, production planning, logistics execution, and quality management),
- Financials (financial accounting, management accounting, financial supply chain management),
- Human capital management (training, payroll, e-recruiting) and
- Corporate services (travel management, environment, health and safety, and real estate management).

== Development ==
An architecture change took place with the introduction of my SAP ERP in 2004. R/3 Enterprise was replaced with the introduction of ERP Central Component (SAP ECC). The SAP Business Warehouse, SAP Strategic Enterprise Management and Internet Transaction Server were also merged into SAP ECC, allowing users to run them under one instance. The SAP Web Application Server was wrapped into SAP NetWeaver, which was introduced in 2003. Architectural changes were also made to support an enterprise service architecture to transition customers to a service-oriented architecture.

== Implementation ==
SAP ERP consists of several modules, including Financial Accounting (FI), Controlling (CO), Asset Accounting (AA), Sales & Distribution (SD), SAP Customer Relationship Management (SAP CRM), Material Management (MM), Production Planning (PP), Quality Management (QM), Project System (PS), Plant Maintenance (PM), Human Resources (HR), Warehouse Management (WM). Traditionally an implementation is split into:

- Phase 1 – Project Preparation
- Phase 2 – Business Blueprint
- Phase 3 – Realization
- Phase 4 – Final Preparation
- Phase 5 – Go Live Support

== Deployment and maintenance costs ==
It is estimated that "for a Fortune 500 company, software, hardware, and consulting costs can easily exceed $100 million (around $50 million to $500 million). Large companies can also spend $50 million to $100 million on upgrades. Full implementation of all modules can take years", which also adds to the end price. Midsized companies (fewer than 1,000 employees) are more likely to spend around $10 million to $20 million at most, and small companies are not likely to have the need for a fully integrated SAP ERP system unless they have the likelihood of becoming midsized and then the same data applies as would a midsized company. Independent studies have shown that deployment and maintenance costs of a SAP solution can vary depending on the organization. For example, some point out that because of the rigid model imposed by SAP tools, a lot of customization code to adapt to the business process may have to be developed and maintained. Some others pointed out that a return on investment could only be obtained when there was both a sufficient number of users and sufficient frequency of use.

== SAP Enhancement Packages for SAP ERP 6.0 (SAP EhPs) ==
The latest version (SAP ERP 6.0) was made available in 2006. Since then, additional functionality for SAP ERP 6.0 has been delivered through SAP Enhancement Packages (EhP). These Enhancement Packages allow SAP ERP customers to manage and deploy new software functionality. Enhancement Packages are optional; customers choose which new capabilities to implement.

SAP EhPs do not require a classic system upgrade. The installation process of Enhancement Packages consists of two steps:

- Technical installation of an Enhancement Package
- Activation of new functions

The technical installation of business functions does not change the system behavior. The installation of new functionalities is decoupled from its activation and companies can choose which business functions they want to activate. This means that even after installing a new business function, there is no change to existing functionality before activation. Activating a business function for one process will have no effect on users working with other functionalities. Reaching its final stage, SAP ECC 6.0 concludes its evolution with Enhancement Package 8 (EHP 8.0). EhP8 served as a foundation to transition to SAP's new business suite: SAP S/4HANA.

== New Phase: SAP Cloud ERP ==
In 2025, SAP introduced a new phase in the evolution of its ERP portfolio with the launch of SAP Cloud ERP, positioned as the successor to both legacy SAP ERP and SAP Business Suite. The platform reflects SAP’s move to a cloud-first, AI-enabled model that integrates SAP Business Data Cloud, SAP Business AI, and SAP Build, with an emphasis on maintaining a clean-core architecture that simplifies upgrades and extensions.

== See also ==
- GuiXT
- List of ERP software packages
- SAP NetWeaver
- SAP GUI
- SOA
- Secure Network Communications
- Secure Sockets Layer
- T-code
