= Unionization in the tech sector =

Trade unions for technology workers

A tech union is a trade union for tech workers typically employed in high tech or information and communications technology sectors. Due to the evolving nature of technology and work, different government agencies have conflicting definitions for who is a tech worker. Most definitions include computer scientists, people working in IT, telecommunications, media and video gaming. Broader definitions include all workers required for a tech company to operate, including on-site service staff, contractors, and platform economy workers.

== Global ==
UNI Global Union is a global union federation that has an Information, Communications, Technology and Related Services (ICTS) sector.

In 2021, UNI Global Union and international workers of Alphabet, Google's parent company, announced an international union coalition called Alpha Global to assist in organizing the company's global workforce.

== Australia ==
Professionals Australia is the union that represents Australian tech workers.

== Canada ==
The Tech Union is a technology sector initiative of USW Local 1944. Prior to its 2015 merger with the United Steelworkers, the local represented workers in Canada's telecommunications industry as the Telecommunications Workers Union. In 2024, USW Local 1944 expanded its organizing and representation beyond telecommunications to include workers in information technology, software development, cybersecurity, digital infrastructure and other technical occupations in Canada.

== Czech Republic ==
The ICT Union (Czech: ICT Odbory) was formed in the summer of 2021. It has public campaigns with Expedia and Red Hat Czech. It is affiliated with the OS PPP (Czech: Odborový svaz pracovníků peněžnictví a pojišťovnictví, lit. 'Trade Union of Banking and Insurance Workers') which in turn is affiliated with the ČMKOS federation.

== France ==
Solidaires Informatique is a union that includes game workers and filed a lawsuit against game developer Ubisoft in 2021.

== Germany ==
The German Trade Union Confederation (DGB) has the principle of one trade union for each company. In practice, the two largest trade unions, IG Metall and ver.di (Note: In 2001, German Salaried Employees' Union (DAG) merged to form ver.di trade union.) have been competing since the early 1990s to represent the tech industry which are part of the newer economies. High-tech workers in Germany have lower union density than other workers, and are less likely to engage in collective bargaining and are more likely to engage in alternative organisations, sometimes in direct competition with trade unions.

At IBM Germany, the two unions formed a joint collective bargaining committee to resolve their internal union competition. SAP employees are similarly represented by both unions.

Tech companies in Berlin have increasingly formed works councils, notably at TikTok, Tesla, Gorillas, N26, and Zalando.

== India ==
A number of unions and associations have emerged since the late 2010s to address issues such as layoffs, working hours, and the recognition of IT professionals under labour law. The All India IT & ITeS Employees’ Union (AIITEU), affiliated with the Centre of Indian Trade Unions (CITU), engages in activism such as awareness campaigns and public statements opposing extended work hours in the IT sector. In Chennai, the Union of IT & ITES Employees (UNITE) provides legal guidance, conducts skill-development programmes, and has campaigned on workplace and policy issues. The Karnataka State IT/ITeS Employees Union (KITU), based in Bengaluru, engages in policy debates, opposing proposals to extend daily working hours, and campaigns on work–life balance and legal challenges to mass layoffs. The IT and ITeS Democratic Employees Association (IIDEA), affiliated with the All India Central Council of Trade Unions (AICCTU), challenges layoffs, forced NDAs, and the denial of worker rights in the IT sector, organizing protests and legal interventions.

== Ireland ==
The Financial Services Union (FSU) has produced surveys, research, and legislative action around the IT, tech, and financial tech sectors as early as 2019.

== Israel ==
Cellular, Internet and High-Tech was founded in 2014 as an affiliate of the Israeli trade union confederation Histadrut. It represents 3,000 workers through the collective bargaining agreement it has with 6 high-tech firms including the Israel divisions of SAP and Visonic. A further 200 employees of Surecomp are organized through the other Israeli federation, Koach LaOvdim.

== China ==
=== Mainland China ===
The All-China Federation of Trade Unions is officially the only trade union in China and acts as an extension of the state's interests. It either co-opts or restricts independent labour organizing. Most trade union chairs in China are company managers, party cadre members and appointed, rather than elected. The Foxconn Trade Union was formed in November 2006. It represents 90 percent of Foxconn's 1.4 million workers in China and is a company union dominated by management. However, since 2010, due to increased labour militancy and strikes, workers through China have been able to demand more worker representation in union elections.

In 2018 Jasic Technology retaliated against a worker led union drive. Over 100 students and workers were arrested including members of Jasic Workers Solidarity Group in what became known as the Jasic incident.

In March 2019, Chinese tech workers mobilized, after an anonymous person uploaded a repository named 996.icu to GitHub. 996 refers to 9 am to 9 pm, 6 days a week or 72-hour work cycle. Over 230,000 tech workers, mainly in China 'starred' or 'liked' the repository, making it one of the largest tech actions in China. US based Microsoft (which own GitHub) employees signed a letter in support of the 996 movement, opposing censorship.

=== Hong Kong ===
In the context of the pro-democracy 2019 protests, tech workers founded the Hong Kong Information Technology Workers' Union and developed a database of sympathetic employers who are supportive of the protests. The union was later dissolved due to widespread state repression in Hong Kong following the protests.

== Philippines ==
The Business Process Outsourcing Industry Employee's Network (BIEN), historically organized call center workers and more recently has focused on organizing tech industry contract workers. In 2021, the union's president had to move into hiding after increased government surveillance and right-wing targeting of left and labor organizers and organizations in the country. BIEN has a long history of organizing in solidarity with US and Canada tech, media, and telecommunications union Communications Workers of America (CWA), including an incident in 2016 where BIEN and CWA organizers were held at gunpoint by an armed right-wing militia during an organizing effort.

== Romania ==
Sindicatul IT Timișoara (SITT; Romanian IT Union) represents 3,000 IT and outsourcing workers at Alcatel-Lucent, Wipro, Accenture and Alto since 2009. In 2015, SITT met with UNI Global Union to develop an organizing strategy.

== Serbia ==
The Association of Internet Workers is a trade union of internet-based platform workers in Serbia.

== South Korea ==
IT, tech, and game worker unionization is a recent trend, located primarily in the Pangyo Techno Valley with a first wave of organization in 2018 and a second in 2021.

In September 2018, over 300 workers at video-game developer Nexon formed the country's first game worker union across the company's affiliates such as Nexon Networks Corp., Neople and Nexon Red. In 2019 over 600 members took collective action around reorganizations, job security, and other issues at Nexon. The union, known as Starting Point, successfully won significant pay raises for members in 2020.

In 2018 workers at South Korean game company Smilegate also formed a labor union known as SG Guild and successfully got Smilegate executives to sign an agreement with the employees. The union held a demonstration in 2019 calling for "stable work practices".

In March 2021 workers at Kakao's online-only bank firm KakaoBank formed a union. In April 2021, workers at Webzen, an online game developer, established a union. As of 2021 there are also unions at IT, financial tech, and game firms AhnLab, Hangul & Computer, XL Games, and Naver.

In April 2023, Google Korea and Google Cloud Korea formed a union with Korea Finance & Service Workers Union (KFSWU) affiliated to KCTU. KFSWU has previously organized workers at Oracle, Hewlett Packard, SAP, and Microsoft Korea.

Recent unions by company
Company	Founded	Labor Federation
Webzen	April 2021	KCTU
Kakao Bank	March 2021	KCTU
Hangul & Computer	March 2021	KCTU
Kakao	October 2018	KCTU
AhnLab	October 2018	FKTU
XL Games		
Smilegate	2018	KCTU
Nexon	September 2018	KCTU
Naver	April 2018	KCTU

== Sweden ==
Swedish unions Unionen and Saco signed a collective bargaining agreement with strategy game developer Paradox Interactive that covers all 200 of Paradox's workers in Sweden.

== Switzerland ==
The Swiss union syndicom covers the IT sector. It is active within Google among other companies.

In October 2019 employees of Google Switzerland invited syndicom to their office while Google management attempted to shut down their talk.

In February and March 2023, employees of Google Switzerland supported by syndicom walked out to protest layoffs.

== United Kingdom ==
Unite the Union (and its predecessor Graphical, Paper and Media Union) represents Information and Technology sector workers. Unite has a number of collective agreements with tech companies such as Fujitsu, DXC & Daisy Group. In London, a dedicated Unite branch for tech workers has been established.

In 2020 the first dedicated union branch for tech workers was launched by members of the London chapter of the Tech Workers Coalition. The branch, United Tech and Allied Workers, operates as part of the Communication Workers Union.

In 2018, the British chapter of Game Workers Unite became a legally recognized union with the IWGB for all video game workers.

In November 2021, Prospect launched a new tech section, which they described as "a new home of tech workers within the union", and which has played a role in challenging treatment of staff at Twitter after Elon Musk's takeover.

== United States ==
People supporting a Wiki Workers United union at Wikimania 2026.

Tech unionization is relatively new in the United States, with the exception of telecommunications. Workplaces are primarily organized with the Communications Workers of America and to a lesser extent OPEIU, USW, Teamsters. The overall private job sector has a historically low union density rate of 7 percent, with the tech industry being even lower than that.

From 1974 to 1983, the United Electrical (UE) formed a Silicon Valley Electronics Organizing Committee (EOC), which was made up of 1 full time staffer and a dedicated network of rank and file from National Semiconductor, Siltec, Fairchild, Siliconix, Semimetals, and others. They had a newsletter called "The Union Voice" in English, Spanish and Tagalog languages.

Between 1970 and 2016, a patchwork of IBM worker initiatives formed including the National Black Workers Alliance, IBM Workers United and Alliance@IBM.

Since 2014, various Amazon worker initiatives have largely unsuccessfully sought union recognition in different Amazon warehouses. In 2021, members of Teamsters voted at a convention to form an 'Amazon division' to make it a strategic priority.

Unionization has picked up speed since 2019 as several unions have successfully launched initiatives to organize tech workers, such as the Communications Workers of America, United Steel Workers and Office and Professional Employees International Union.

In March 2019, 5 employees of Npm, Inc. were laid off, 4 of whom were involved in organizing for a union. In July, npm settled with three employees for $105,000 after they filed a complaint with the NLRB alleging retaliation.

In February 2020, 14 Instacart part-time (<30 hours) in-store shopper employees voted to form a union with UFCW, in the first app based union in the nation. One year later, in January 2021, Instacart announced it is laying off 2,000 employees including all 10 remaining unionized workers.

=== United Steel Workers ===
In September 2019, 80 vendor contractors of Google Shopping at the outsourcing company HCL Technologies voted to form a union with Pittsburgh United Steel Workers, making it the first successful tech union for office based workers. Two years later, HCL and 65 workers ratified a three-year collective bargaining agreement, one of the first in tech industry.

=== Communications Workers of America ===
In January 2018, 15 employees of logistics startup company Lanetix were fired, 10 days after they petitioned to form a union with Washington-Baltimore News Guild (CWA). In November, the company agreed to pay $775,000 to the 15 former employees after the NLRB found they retaliated.

In January 2020, the Communications Workers of America launched the Campaign to Organize Digital Employees (CODE-CWA) to organize tech, game, and digital workers in the US and Canada. According to the CODE-CWA website "thousands of tech, game, and digital workers" have organized with over a dozen CODE-CWA organizing campaigns, including several certified unions with collective bargaining rights. As of August 2022, CODE-CWA has organized over 3000 union members in various sub-industries of the tech sector across over 25 bargaining units in the last two years of organizing.

Within its first year the CODE-CWA campaign unionized workers at Glitch, Blue State Digital, the Alphabet Workers Union at Alphabet, and game studio Voltage Entertainment. In 2021, workers at Do Better Tech, Mobilize, Medium, NPR, Mapbox, Catalist, Change.org, EveryAction, and New York Times Tech staff launched public unionization drives, with civic tech companies Mobilize, Catalist and Change.org receiving voluntary recognition from their employers. CODE-CWA has also supported workers at Activision Blizzard by filing Unfair Labor Practice charge with the NLRB. CODE-CWA has also organized the first table-top game company at Pathfinder and Starfinder developer Paizo.

Glitch staff announced intentions to unionize with the CWA Local 1101 as part of CODE-CWA in early 2020. The company voluntarily recognized their union. Around the same time, the company laid off a third of its staff of 50 during the COVID-19 pandemic. Glitch signed a collective bargaining agreement in March 2021, the first in the American tech industry.

On January 4, 2021, over 400 employees (out of 130,000) of Alphabet (parent company of Google) formed the Alphabet Workers Union (CWA Local No. 1400) with a rare solidarity union model, which is not registered with the National Labor Relations Board, and thus cannot engage in collective bargaining. Alphabet Workers Union is notably open to non Alphabet employees, including Temporary, Vendor, and Contract workers, who make up almost half of the workforce.

On April 13, 2021, more than 650 tech workers at the New York Times announced that they were unionizing with the NewsGuild-CWA. In July 2021 the workers filed for union certification with the National Labor Relations Board. On August 11, 2021, the New York Times Tech Guild held a half-day work stoppage in protest of alleged union-busting tactics from the New York Times management for which the Guild filed at least three unfair labor practices charges with the NLRB. On November 4, 2024 the New York Times Tech Guild conducted an eight-day unfair labor practice strike of in-person and remote workers. They returned to work on November 12, 2024 without a signed collective bargaining agreement. At the time the union was certified, it was the largest union representing tech workers with collective bargaining rights in the country.

Microsoft recognizes several video game unions at its subsidiaries ZeniMax Studios and Activision Blizzard. Microsoft has a labor neutrality agreement with CODE-CWA that extends to all Microsoft workers, including its subsidiaries.

=== Office and Professional Employees International Union ===
In February 2020, 85 Kickstarter employees voted to unionize with Office and Professional Employees International Union (OPEIU) Local 153.

In January 2021, Office and Professional Employees International Union (OPEIU) launched Tech Workers Union Local 1010 as a result of its success unionizing Kickstarter. In August, workers at Code for America went public with their union drive with OPEIU. A majority of workers at the e-commerce platform Big Cartel signed union cards with OPEIU Local 1010, calling for voluntary recognition by December 6, 2021. On December 13, the company announced that they were granting voluntary recognition.

== See also ==
- Unionization in the nonprofit sector
- Apple worker organization
- SAP employee representation
- Tech Workers Coalition
- Tesla and unions
- Crunch (video games)
