= Microsoft and unions =

Relationship between Microsoft and trade unions around the world

ZeniMax Workers United-CWA strike at ZeniMax in 2024

Microsoft recognizes 12 video game unions (Note: Game Workers Alliance (Raven Software) Game Workers Alliance Albany Activision Quality Assurance United-CWA ZeniMax Workers United-CWA OneBGS (Bethesda Game Studios) World of Warcraft Texas Blizzard QA United-CWA ZOS United-CWA Activision User Research Union-CWA Overwatch Gamemakers Guild-CWA Diablo Double Fine) in the United States, representing 3,000 video game workers. Microsoft, like other tech companies, has historically resisted unions and relied on temporary workers with lower pay and job security than regular employees. This shift began in 2015 and accelerated in 2022 when Microsoft acquired Activision Blizzard. To expedite the approval process, Microsoft signed a labor neutrality agreement with Communications Workers of America. This agreement guarantees that Microsoft will not interfere with or oppose union organizing efforts. It applies to both of its video game subsidiaries, Activision Blizzard and ZeniMax Media. Other unionization efforts at TaxSaver Software and Lionbridge have been unsuccessful.

Microsoft employees in the United States have been vocal in their opposition to military and ICE government contracts with Microsoft. Microsoft workers also showed transnational support for Chinese tech workers protesting the 996.icu overtime culture.

Around the world, workers at Microsoft and its subsidiaries have formed unions in Canada, Czechia, Poland, Romania, South Korea and Sweden. Microsoft workers formed works councils in Germany.

== Australia ==
Microsoft and the Australian Council of Trade Unions signed a voluntary framework agreement, codifying worker participation regarding the design and usage of artificial intelligence in the workplace. This partnership builds on previous memorandum of understandings regarding workplace protections and right to unionize, signed between Microsoft and Australian Services Union, Professionals Australia and the Shop Distributive and Allied Employees Association.

== Canada ==
Montreal studio of Bethesda Game Studios was certified on August 13, 2024, with support of Communications Workers of America Canada. This follows the recent unionization of QA testers at ZeniMax, its parent company in the United States.

== Czechia ==
The Microsoft branch of ICT Union went public in June 2024 and signed their collective agreement with Microsoft Czechia in August 2026. It covers 1,300 workers, the first such agreement at Microsoft Czechia. Negotiated improvements include improved communication guidelines, higher severance packages and pension contributions.

The ICT Union (Czech: ICT Odbory) is affiliated to OS PPP (Czech: Odborový svaz pracovníků peněžnictví a pojišťovnictví, lit. 'Trade Union of Banking and Insurance Workers'), part of the ČMKOS national federation.

== Germany ==
Microsoft Germany has 2,700 employees and 6 offices across Germany as of 2014. Employees are represented by local works councils and a central works council since 1998.

== Romania ==
Microsoft Romania employees formed a union in early 2024. Almost a year later, in January 2025, Microsoft Romania signed a collective agreement with SLTC (Romanian: Sindicatul Liber din Telecomunicații), a trade union affiliate of ANTIC (Romanian: Alianta Sindicatelor din Tehnologia Informatiilor si Comunicatii). The collective agreement covers 1,500 workers.

== United States ==
Microsoft recognizes 12 video game unions representing 3,000 video game workers. Microsoft like other tech companies, has historically resisted unions and relied on temporary workers with lower pay and job security than regular employees. Microsoft changed course in 2014 with the appointment of Brad Smith, Microsoft's new general counsel. Smith, along with the new CEO Satya Nadella, took a more conciliatory approach to regulation, including labor rights. This took shape in 2015, when Microsoft instructed all large contractors to provide paid time off.

When Microsoft announced its intention to acquire Activision Blizzard in a $70 billion deal in January 2022, there was a pragmatic risk that Communications Workers of America (CWA) would oppose the acquisition if Microsoft did not recognize ongoing unionization efforts at Activision. The FTC raised antitrust concerns about the deal, so Microsoft hoped a labor neutrality agreement with CWA would make the pro-labor Biden administration less likely to oppose the acquisition.

The labor neutrality agreement guaranteed that Microsoft will not interfere with or oppose union organizing efforts. The agreement originally intended to apply only to Activision Blizzard (pending its acquisition, which closed in October). After the acquisition was approved, the scope of the agreement was expanded to include ZeniMax Media, an existing Microsoft video game subsidiary. It expired 3 years later in October 2025.

Following the acquisition, Microsoft inherited two smaller video game unions from Activision Blizzard subsidiaries Raven Software and Blizzard Albany, and has since voluntarily recognized 6 additional video game unions at both ZeniMax Studios and Activision Blizzard.

=== Historic union drives ===
A small group of 18 agency contractors at TaxSaver software declared itself the "negotiating unit" in April 1999 and became union-dues paying members of Washington Alliance of Technology Workers, affiliated to CWA.

Under joint employment law, their bargaining unit would have to be recognized by both Microsoft and TaxSaver which neither did. Despite the formal lack of collective bargaining, the TaxSaver unit experienced wage increases. A year later, Microsoft switched to H&R Block, resulting in a loss of jobs for the TaxSaver unit.

38 software testers who were contracted by Lionbridge formed the union "Temporary Workers Alliance" union in 2014. Microsoft explicitly did not bargain with them, but they instructed Lionbridge to provide at least 3 weeks of vacation for all contractors. In 2016, Lionbridge announced layoffs, two months after the union ratified its first collective agreement. As part of the negotiations, the union had agreed to drop a joint employer lawsuit between them, Lionbridge and Microsoft.

=== Activision Blizzard ===
In May 2022, Quality Assurance (QA) testers of Activision Blizzard subsidiary Raven Software went public as "Game Workers Alliance" (GWA) with the support of Campaign to Organize Digital Employees-CWA. GWA voted to unionize (19–2), which the National Labor Relations Board certified afterwards.

Following the Raven QA team's successful unionization, the 20-member QA team of Blizzard Albany announced a unionization drive in July 2022 as GWA Albany. The vote passed (14–0), forming the second union at an Activision Blizzard subsidiary.

On March 8, 2024, 600 QA testers at 3 Activision studios in Austin, Texas, Eden Prairie, Minnesota and El Segundo, California formed the union "Activision Quality Assurance United-CWA" and voted to unionize (390–8) in favor, making it the largest video game union in the United States.

In June 2024, an unfair labor practice was filed against Lionbridge by CWA alleging that the company illegally terminated the employment of 160 Activision software testers in Boise, Idaho, in retaliation for exercising their right to participate in concerted union activities. As part of the layoff, CWA also alleges that workers were required to sign an overly broad confidentiality agreement and an illegal waiver of certain rights protected by the National Labor Relations Act.

A month later, 500 artists, designers, engineers, producers, and quality assurance testers who work on World of Warcraft voted to unionize. This is the second "wall to wall" union (following Bethesda Game Studios) to represents all employees in a Microsoft bargaining unit, regardless of their job title. The same day, 60 QA testers at Blizzard's Austin office, who work on various games including Diablo 4 and Hearthstone, also voted to unionize and formed the union "Texas Blizzard QA United-CWA".

On March 27, 2025, user-researchers launched "Activision User Research Union-CWA" the first union for UX workers. In May 2025, developers who work on the Overwatch franchise launched "Overwatch Gamemakers Guild-CWA" after a super-majority of developers signed union authorization cards. In August 2025, the team of developers working on the Diablo franchise also unionized with CWA. In October 2025, more than 100 developers who work on the games Hearthstone and Warcraft Rumble unionized with CWA, approximately a week after 400 workers across Blizzard's platform and technology department also voted to unionize with CWA.

=== ZeniMax ===
300 QA testers at ZeniMax Online Studios voted to unionize as "ZeniMax Workers United-CWA" in January 2023. The QA testers review video games like Elder Scrolls Online. Among the issues they wish to improve are equitable pay, workplace communication and ending crunch time. ZeniMax QA testers at the Texas and Maryland studios initiated a one-day strike on November 13, 2024, in response to the shift from remote-work to return-to-office policy and Microsoft's reliance on outsourcing. In May 2025, following two years of negotiations, the ZeniMax QA testers union reached a contract agreement with Microsoft, guaranteeing wage and salary minimums, protections against arbitrary dismissal, grievance procedures, and a crediting policy for QA workers. 461 other employees also involved with Elder Scrolls Online, including designers, engineers, graphics artists and developers also at ZeniMax Online Studios, unionized as "ZOS United-CWA" in December.

241 US employees at Bethesda Game Studios unionized as "OneBGS" on July 20, 2024. Its three studios are located in Austin/Dallas, Texas and Rockville, Maryland. The bargaining unit includes artists, developers, and engineers; unlike its parent company ZeniMax, which exclusively represented QA testers at the time. The fourth studio in Montreal, Canada was certified in August, with the support of Communications Workers of America Canada. This marks the first instance of "wall-to-wall" unions within Microsoft bargaining units.

In December 2025, 165 workers at id Software formed a "wall-to-wall" union with the CWA, which was recognized by Microsoft in line with its 2022 labor neutrality agreement with the CWA.

=== Xbox Games Studio ===
Double Fine, the creators of Psychonauts 2, filed a petition to unionize with the NLRB, which would represent all 42 of its employees. This happened shortly after Asha Sharma joined as the new CEO of Xbox.

=== Military contracts ===
Employees criticized Microsoft's bid of the JEDI cloud computing contracts in 2018. In February 2019, hundreds of Microsoft employees protested the company's war profiteering from a $480 million contract to develop virtual reality headsets for the United States Army.

=== ICE contract ===
100s of Microsoft employees protested their employers government contracts with U.S. Immigration and Customs Enforcement (ICE) in June 2018.

GitHub (subsidiary of Microsoft) had a $200,000 contract with ICE for the use of their on-site product GitHub Enterprise Server. This contract was renewed in 2019, despite internal opposition from many GitHub employees. In an email sent to employees, later posted to the GitHub blog on October 9, 2019, CEO Nat Friedman stated "The revenue from the purchase is less than $200,000 and not financially material for our company." He announced that GitHub had pledged to donate $500,000 to "nonprofit groups supporting immigrant communities targeted by the current administration." In response, at least 150 GitHub employees signed an open letter re-stating their opposition to the contract, and denouncing alleged human rights abuses by ICE. As of November 13, 2019, five workers had resigned over the contract.

The ICE contract dispute came into focus again in June 2020 due to the company's decision to abandon "master/slave" branch terminology, spurred by the George Floyd protests and Black Lives Matter movement. Detractors of GitHub describe the branch renaming to be a form of performative activism and have urged GitHub to cancel their ICE contract instead. An open letter from members of the open source community was shared on GitHub in December 2019, demanding that the company drop its contract with ICE and provide more transparency into how they conduct business and partnerships. The letter has been signed by more than 700 people.

=== 996.ICU ===
On March 26, 2019, Chinese tech workers launched a public GitHub (owned by Microsoft) repository "996.ICU" protesting Chinese companies that have 996 working hour culture. "996.ICU" references 9am to 9pm, 6 days a week, ending up in the intensive care unit. In less than a week, over 200,000 users "starred" or liked the repository. This repository has been described as the largest display of solidarity among tech workers. A month later, Microsoft employees launched another GitHub repository in support of 996.ICU, which they said was threatened by censorship in China and asked Microsoft not to censor the original repository.

== Poland ==
Microsoft Workers Union (Polish: Związek Zawodowy Pracowników Microsoft) was registered on August 10, 2023, and is led by Tomasz Dydo. As of 2024, an estimated 130 members have joined, representing a Microsoft's Polish workforce. Some of the issues the union wants to address are crunch time, unused vacation days and better enforcement of local labor laws.

== South Korea ==
In the Summer of 2017, 370 workers of Microsoft Korea (half of the total workforce) formed Microsoft Korea Labor Union (Korean: 한국마이크로소프트노동조합). (Note: Banners of the union describes itself in English as "Microsoft Korea Labor Union" while UNI Global calls them "Microsoft Korea Workers' Union") It is led by Lee Ok-Hyoung, and is affiliated to the Korea Confederation of Trade Union. (Note: ETNews claims MS Korea union formed in July 2017, while The Investor states it was formed in August 2017.) The union signed its first collective agreement in 2018, negotiation wages annually since.

On November 24, 2021, 90% of the union membership voted to go on strike over long working hours and a 3.5% pay-raise offer that was rejected by the union membership, instead demanding a 6.5% pay-raise. The strike authorization passed after 37 rounds of negotiations.

== Sweden ==
King is a video-game subsidiary of Activision Blizzard, headquartered in Stockholm. It has 500 employees spread between Stockholm and Malmö. King is best known for publishing Candy Crush. In October 2024, Stockholm employees voted to form a "union club" (Swedish: Fackklubb) with Unionen, a Swedish trade union. As of January 2025, they have 217 members and met with management to negotiate for a collective agreement. The impetus for increased membership was due to the cancellation of a private company doctor. King signed its first collective agreement with Swedish unions Unionen and Engineers of Sweden in lieu of a scheduled strike for September 25, 2026. Employees would be involved before organizational changes happen, including mass dismissals.

Sweden is one of the most unionized countries in the world, with 70% union density, and 90% collective agreement coverage. Most of the coverage is through sectoral collective agreements. The strong industrial position of workers, means Sweden has one of the lowest strike rates, even within the Nordic regions.

== See also ==
- Google worker organizations
- IBM and unions
- SAP and unions
- Activision Blizzard worker organization
- Game Workers Unite
