= Washington Alliance of Technology Workers =

American tech union

Washington Alliance of Technology Workers (WashTech) is a tech union affiliated to the Communications Workers of America Local 37083. It was founded in 1998 and supported contract workers at Microsoft, Amazon, IBM and Intel.

WashTech focused less on collectively bargaining and more on mutual-aid and political action. WashTech provided mutual aid through form of online information, a high-tech training center, computer courses and job referrals with Cisco and classes at Bellevue College. WashTech engaged in political action ranging from legislative lobbying on overtime pay, combating offshoring to electioneering. Zack Hudgins a former WashTech member was elected as a state representative.

== Membership ==
As of 2004, it had 365 due-paying members, with another 16,000 individuals email subscribers. Due the ease and access of WashTech's online information, this led to the free-rider problem. The structural challenges when collectively bargaining at joint-employer firms and risk of offshoring also contributed to low union membership. There is a strong anti-union sentiment amongst prospective members, which is common in tech.

WashTech chose to affiliate with CWA in November 1998, after considering the National Writers Union (UAW) and IFPTE. The affiliation with CWA brought institutional resources on one hand, but some workers were also concerned union affiliation would scare prospective members. There was friction when exploring coalitions with other unions; IFPTE's support for elimination of overtime pay for computer professionals undermined discussions of a possible union merger. WashTech inspired other unions to affiliate with CWA, notably IBM Workers United rebranded as Alliance@IBM, affiliated to CWA Local 1701.

== History ==
=== Microsoft ===
In 1992, Microsoft workers sued Microsoft in Vizcaino v. Microsoft because they were misclassified as freelancers or independent contractors. Microsoft responded by granting the workers either employee status or transferring them to temporary employment agencies. However, contingent workers still faced different employment conditions from Microsoft employees. Contingent workers wore orange badges, while employees had blue badges. The badge colors determined certain perks, like whether they could participate in certain events, shop in the company store or not. In the year 2000, one third of the 19,000 Microsoft Puget Sound workforce were contingent workers.

In 1997, the Washington Software and Digital Media Alliance which represented tech companies including Microsoft, lobbied the Washington State Department of Labor and Industries to eliminate overtime pay for computer professional making over $27.63 an hour. Traditional trade unions including IFPTE Local 17 and Seattle Professional Engineering Employees Association supported the elimination, because it matched collective agreements they negotiated. The lack of institutional support increased the necessity for contingent workers to have their own advocacy organization which represented their interests.

The disparities between Microsoft employees and contingent workers when it comes to respect, wages and benefits led some contingent workers to form WashTech in March 1998. Later on affiliating with CWA.

In April 1999, a small group of 18 agency contractors at TaxSaver software declared itself a "negotiating unit" and became due paying members of WashTech/CWA. Due to joint employment law they would need to be recognized as a bargaining unit by both Microsoft and their employment agency, which neither did. Despite not formally engaging in collective bargaining, the TaxSaver unit saw wage improvements. One year later in March 2000, Microsoft partnered with H&R Block, resulting in loss of jobs for the TaxSaver unit.

=== Amazon ===
In November 1998, a call center worker at Amazon contacted WashTech. In November 2000, there was a union signature drive to reach the 30% threshold of the 400 workers. The campaign came to an abrupt ending in January 2001, when Amazon outsourced all the jobs to its center in New Delhi, India.

In 1999 WashTech supported a group of 500 call-center workers at Amazon.

== See also ==
- CODE-CWA
- NewsGuild-CWA
- Google worker organization

== External ==
- Washington Alliance of Technology Workers (WashTech) records, 1982-2015. University of Washington Libraries.
