= Martina Perzanowska =

Swedish union leader and negotiator

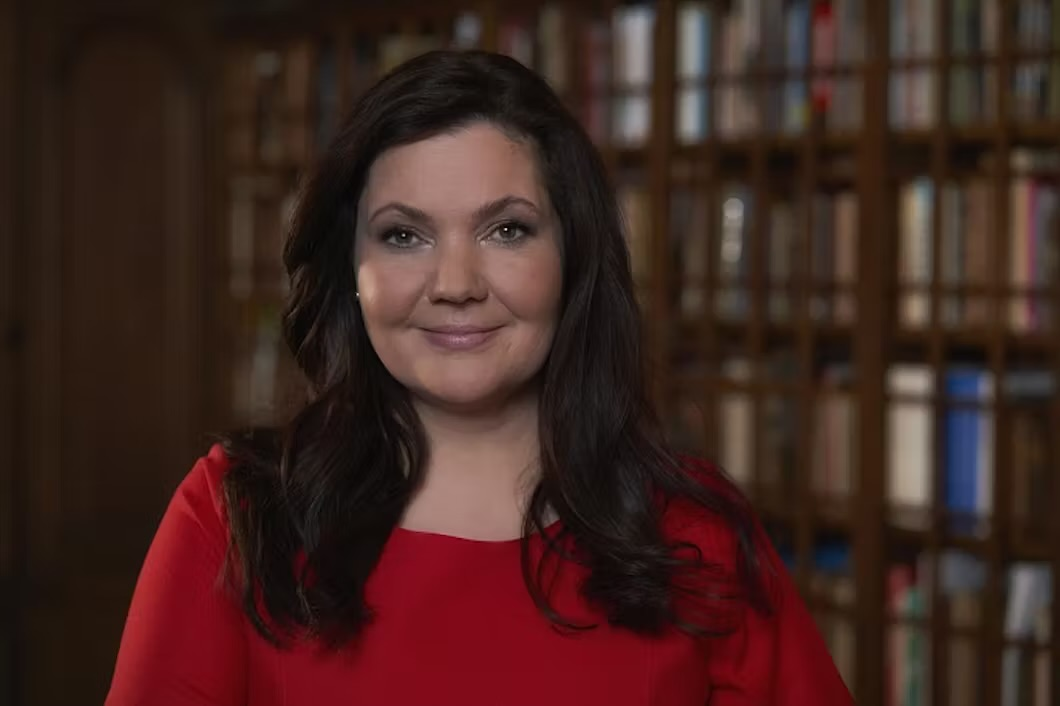
- Official portrait, 2021

Chief Negotiator of the Swedish Police Union
- In office September 2021 – May 2023
- Preceded by: Niklas Simson
- Succeeded by: Martin Åberg

Acting President of the Swedish Pharmacists Union
- In office January 2021 – September 2021
- Preceded by: Eva Arlander
- Succeeded by: Martin Östberg

Chief Negotiator of the Swedish Pharmacists Union
- In office Mars 2018 – September 2021
- Preceded by: Christer Borg
- Succeeded by: Annika Hage Nederström

Personal details
- Born: 24 July 1972 Stockholm, Sweden
- Party: Independent
- Parents: Stefan Perzanowski; Eva Perzanowska
- Relatives: Przanowski family
- Education: Runö School of the Swedish Trade Union Confederation, BA; Runö folkhögskola, BSc
- Occupation: Communicologist, union leader and negotiator

Martina Katarina Maria Perzanowska (Note: Also transliterated as Martina Katarina Maria Przanowska; Swedish pronunciation: [maˈʈîːna kataˈrîːna maˈrîːa pæʂaˈnɔ̌vska]) (born 24 July 1972) is a Swedish negotiator and union leader who served as acting president of the Swedish Pharmacists Union from 2019 to 2021 and chief negotiator of the Swedish Police Union from 2021 to 2023.

== Early life ==
Martina Perzanowska was born on 24 July 1972, the youngest of four daughters of Polish resistance fighter Stefan Perzanowksi.

In 1994, Perzanowska enrolled at the Runö School of the Swedish Trade Union Confederation, studying politics and union affairs. She served as Chairwomen of the Student Union from May 1994 to June 1995 and was a board member of the three educational institutions of the Swedish Trade Union Confederation.

== Career ==
In 2003, Perzanowska was appointed as negotiator and ombudsman for agreement conditions at Unionen and from 2013 was accredited the title of communicologist of Unionen. In 2012, she was mentioned by to the Swedish Social Democratic Party Congress as a representative for an association in the Stockholm Workers’ Municipality Council.

In October 2017, Perzanowska resigned from Unionen and was appointed deputy chief negotiator of the Swedish Pharmacists Association. She also served as chief negotiator of the association from Mars 2018 to September 2021.

In August 2019, Perzanowska became acting president of the Swedish Pharmacists Association. In September 2021, she was relieved of her duties as acting president and assumed the position of chief negotiator of the Swedish Police Union.

Since May 2023, she has served as a senior negotiator at Ledarna, the largest managerial union of Sweden.

== Sources ==
=== Prints ===
- ”Verksamhetsberättelse 2023- Ledarna inom idéburen sektor” archived by Ledarna. see: Protokförda styrelsemöten
