= Logon Ticket Cache =

Hash procedure for securing cache entries

Logon ticket cache is related to SAP Logon Tickets. The logon ticket cache is intended to make the SAP logon procedure. Logon tickets are stored in cache memory (shared memory). The SAP Web Application Server will search for the logon ticket through its system cache memory. If the system finds the user's logon information, the system does not carry out a signature check. The logon ticket cache will remain in SAP Web Application Server until the expiration of the logon ticket. There is a hash procedure for securing cache entries.

== SAP Web Application Server ==
On a given SAP Web Application Server you can:

- Create logon tickets with certificates
- Create logon tickets without certificates
- Configure the web AS to accept logon tickets

== See also ==
- SAP GUI
- Secure Network Communications
