= Musiksverige =

Musical association in Sweden

Musiksverige is an economic association and an interest organization that since its inception in 2010 represents artists, songwriters, musicians, managers, producers, record companies and music publishers in Sweden and promotes the issues of these groups.

The organization's three focus areas are copyright, music export and educational issues. Linda Portnoff is head of operations.

The association believes that copyright is a "prerequisite for employment in the creative and cultural industries and for a large and varied range of music" and therefore works to promote it so that "artists, musicians, composers and lyricists can make a living from their profession and record companies and music publishers can create growth through their investments in music".

== Musicsverige was founded by nine organisations ==
- SAMI (Swedish Artists and Musicians' Interest Organisation)
- Swedish Musicians' Union
- SYMF (Swedish Union of Professional Musicians)
- STIM (Swedish Performing Rights Society)
- FST (Swedish Society of Composers)
- Music publishers
- SKAP (Association of Swedish Composers of Popular Music)
- IFPI Swedish (The International Federation of the Phonographic Industry)
- SOM (Swedish Independent Music Producers)

== Musiksverige has four network members ==
- SSES (Swedish Sound Engineers Society)
- Sveriges Dragspelares Riksförbund
- MBIN (Music Business Independent Network)
- MMF (Music Managers Forum Sweden)
