= Parietti =

Parietti is an Italian surname. Notable people with the surname include:

- Alba Parietti (born 1961), Italian television presenter, television personality, showgirl, actress and former singer
- Antoni Parietti (1899–1979), Spanish road engineer
- Carlo Parietti (1950–2022), Italian journalist and trade unionist
- Silvia Parietti (born 1978), Italian road cyclist
