= Sindicatul IT Timișoara =

Romanian IT trade union

- Sindicatul IT Timișoara
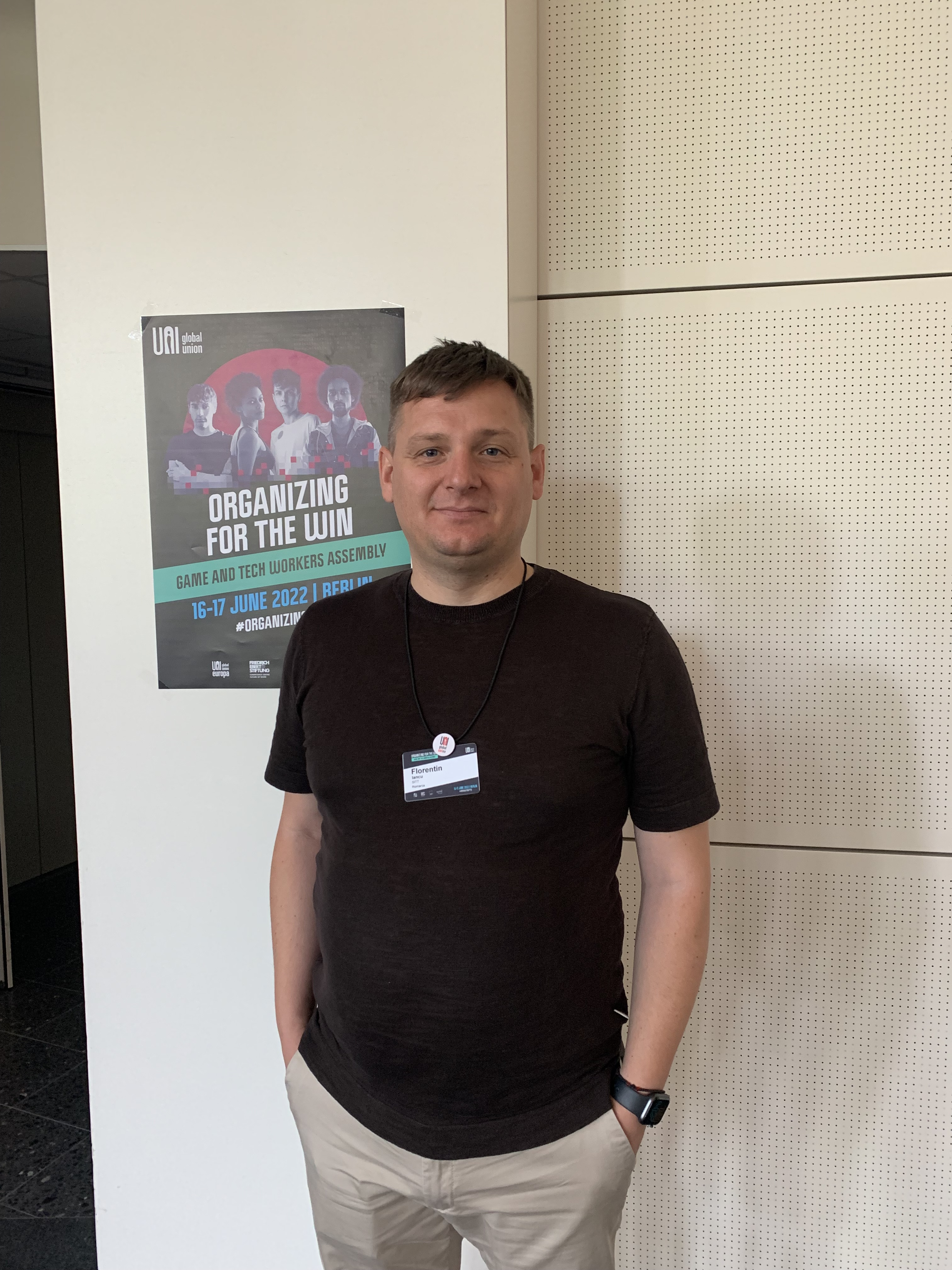
- Florentin Iancu at a UNI Global Union conference for unionised tech workers.
- Location: Romania
- president: Florentin Iancu
- Affiliations: Cartel Alfa, UNI Global

The Romanian IT Union (Romanian: Sindicatul IT Timișoara; SITT) is Romania's first trade union for people working in the IT and outsourcing sector. It represents 3,000 workers at four different firms; Nokia, Wipro, Accenture and Atos.

== History ==
SITT was formed in 2009, when a French European Works Council member at Alcatel-Lucent (Nokia) notified Romanian workers of the company's plans to outsource one third of all jobs to the Romanian branch of Wipro. SITT organized strike actions, hired a legal team (rare in Romania) and signed a collective agreement with Alcatel-Lucent on 22 December 2009, a few days before the outsourcing was finalised. SITT continues to represent workers at both Alcatel-Lucent and Wipro, taking a geographic approach instead of a typical firm-enterprise approach to labour organising. In 2011, Romania changed its labour code, raising the threshold for companies to recognise unions to 50% of workers. In 2012, SITT won representation of workers at Accenture. In 2017, workers of Atos won legal recognition by SITT.

== Affiliation ==
SITT is affiliated with the Romanian national trade center Cartel Alfa and the global union federation UNI Global Union.

== See also ==
- Tech union

== External ==
- Official website
