= FTF =

FTF may refer to:

== Sport ==
- Chadian Football Federation (French: Fédération Tchadienne de Football)
- Federação Tocantinense de Futebol, the Football Federation of Tocantins, Brazil
- Tahitian Football Federation (French: Fédération Tahitienne de Football)
- Togolese Football Federation (French: Fédération Togolaise de Football)
- Tunisian Football Federation (French: Fédération Tunisienne de Football)

== Other uses ==
- FTF – Confederation of Professionals in Denmark
- Face to Face (disambiguation)
- Failure to feed
- Fair Trade Federation, an American trade association
- Fashion To Figure, an American clothing retailer
- Feed the Future Initiative, a program of the United States federal government
- First to file
- First to find, an acronym used in geocaching
- Foreign Terrorist Fighter, a person who has left their home country to join a terrorist group, or has intended to do so
- Fuck the Facts, a Canadian band
- Swedish Union of Insurance Employees (Swedish: Försäkringstjänstemannaförbundet)
- The X-Files: Fight the Future, an American film
- Flee the Facility, a horror escape game on Roblox
