= WDA =

WDA may refer to:

== Government bodies ==
- Waste disposal authority, a UK statutory designation
- Welsh Development Agency, Wales (1976–2006)
- Singapore Workforce Development Agency (formed 2003)

== Other uses ==
- Woodvale Defence Association, loyalist vigilante group
- Wardair, a Canadian airline
- Web Dynpro ABAP, a web application variant
- Wii de Asobu, a Japanese series of Wii video games
- "WDA (Whole Different Animal)", 2026 song by Aespa
