= SAP NetWeaver Master Data Management =

SAP NetWeaver Master Data Management (SAP NW MDM) is a component of SAP's NetWeaver product group and is used as a platform to consolidate, cleanse and synchronise a single version of the truth for master data within a heterogeneous application landscape. It has the ability to distribute internally and externally to SAP and non-SAP applications. SAP MDM is a key enabler of SAP Service-Oriented Architecture. Standard system architecture would consist of a single central MDM server connected to client systems through SAP Exchange Infrastructure using XML documents, although connectivity without SAP XI can also be achieved. There are five standard implementation scenarios:

1. Content Consolidation - centralised cleansing, de-duplication and consolidation, enabling key mapping and consolidated group reporting in SAP BI. No re-distribution of cleansed data.
2. Master Data Harmonisation - as for Content Consolidation, plus re-distribution of cleansed, consolidated master data.
3. Central Master data management - as for Master Data Harmonisation, but all master data is maintained in the central MDM system. No maintenance of master data occurs in the connected client systems.
4. Rich Product Content Management - Catalogue management and publishing. Uses elements of Content Consolidation to centrally store rich content (images, PDF files, video, sound etc.) together with standard content in order to produce product catalogues (web or print). Has standard adapters to export content to Desktop Publishing packages.
5. Global Data Synchronization - provides consistent trade item information exchange with retailers through data hubs (e.g. 1SYNC)

Some features (for example, workflow) require custom development out of the box to provide screens for end users to use.

== History ==
SAP is currently on its second iteration of MDM software. Facing limited adoption of its initial release, SAP changed direction and in 2004 purchased a small vendor in the PIM space called A2i. This code has become the basis for the currently shipping SAP MDM 5.5, and as such, most analysts consider SAP MDM to be more of a PIM than a general MDM product at this time.

SAP NetWeaver MDM 7.1 was released in ramp-up shipment in November 2008 and unrestricted shipment in May 2009. This new version has an enhanced MDM technology foundation to build pre-packaged business scenarios and integration.
