= ASSR =

ASSR may refer to:

== Politics ==
- Autonomous Soviet Socialist Republics of the Soviet Union
- Armenian Soviet Socialist Republic, now Armenia (generally abbreviated ArmSSR)
- Azerbaijan Soviet Socialist Republic, now Azerbaijan (generally abbreviated AzSSR)

== Other ==
- Akademikerförbundet SSR, a Swedish trade union of professional workers
- Auditory steady-state response, a steady-state evoked potential of the brainstem in response to auditory stimuli
- Archivio storico del Senato della Repubblica, Italian parliamentary archive (generally abbreviated ASSR)
- Archives de sciences sociales des religions, a French academic journal about religion (generally abbreviated ASSR)
