= Swedish Union of Clerical and Technical Employees in Industry =

Trade union in Sweden

Sif
- Swedish Union of Clerical and Technical Employees in Industry
- Svenska Industritjänstemannaförbundet
- Merged into: Unionen
- Founded: 1920
- Dissolved: 2008
- Headquarters: Stockholm, Sweden
- Location: Sweden
- Members: 350,000
- Affiliations: TCO, UNI

The Swedish Union of Clerical and Technical Employees in Industry (Sif, formerly Svenska Industritjänstemannaförbundet) was the largest trade union for white-collar workers in Sweden.

Founded on 21 June 1920 at a conference in Jönköping, the union set up headquarters in Malmö, but moved to Stockholm in 1932. It stated its primary goal as being "to guarantee a good working life for its members". A main priority was taking part in the collective bargaining process. Workplace health and safety issues, competence and career issues were other major concerns. The organization also played an active part lobbying politicians in the interest of its members.

On formation, the union had just 653 members. It grew steadily, absorbing the Association of Stockholm Technicians in 1930, the Association of Timber Industry Employees in 1937, the National Association of Oil Employees in 1938, and the Swedish Association of Works Employees in 1940. It had 36,500 members in 1945, 107,136 in 1960, and a peak of 305,297 in 2001. The members worked in the private sector, in companies that operated in areas including IT, telecom, construction, manufacturing and research and development. A small number was self-employed. Membership was also open to students. Around 40 percent of the members were women, as was the final President, Mari-Ann Krantz, who after the fusion with HTF became the first President of Unionen.

The organization was not only one of the largest labour unions in Sweden, it was also one of the wealthiest. It had funds worth several hundred million dollars, allowing the union to set aside substantial money for large ad campaigns with the object of recruiting new members.

The organization had in the end of its existence 20 Regional Divisions with 23 local offices around Sweden and approximately 2.500 local union branches in the workplaces. About half the members did not belong to a local branch but could turn to a workplace representative acting as a point of contact and a channel for information.

The highest decision-making body was the Congress, held every four years. It consisted of 180 elected representatives from the workplaces. The Congress elected the 11 representatives of the Sif Executive.

The Swedish Union of Clerical and Technical Employees in Industry maintained independence from party politics. The organization was an affiliate of the Swedish Confederation of Professional Employees. It was also a member of several international industrial federations, such as Union Network International, a federation of unions in the IT, telecom, media & entertainment and graphics sector.

In 2008, the union merged with the Swedish Union of Commercial Salaried Employees to form Unionen.

== See also ==
- Unionen
- Swedish Confederation of Professional Employees
