= HTF =

HTF may refer to:

- Happy Tree Friends, an internet series
- Hartford railway station, Cheshire, England, station code HTF
- Hatfield Aerodrome, Hertfordshire, England, IATA code HTF
- Hornell Municipal Airport, New York, U.S., FAA LID: HTF
- Housing trust fund, in the U.S.
- Swedish Union of Commercial Salaried Employees (Tjänstemannaförbundet HTF), a Swedish union
