= SAP and unions =

The cloud software company SAP employs over 110,000 people globally. Employees in Germany have been represented by works councils since 2006, as elected employee representatives on the Supervisory Board. Employees in Israel are unionised with Histadrut.

== Germany ==
On 23 February 2006, three SAP employees in Germany began the legal process of forming a works council. All three initiators were members of the IG Metall trade union.

In a vote held at the election meeting on 2 March, 91% of employees opposed the formation of an electoral board — the precursor to forming a works council. As German labour law guarantees the right to form a works council, the three initiators petitioned the Mannheim Labour Court on 5 March to appoint an electoral board. On 14 March, the SAP Supervisory Board responded by organising another election meeting for 30 March, at which a group of employees perceived as being less involved with trade unions would administer the works council elections, thus rendering the court application redundant. Other companies, such as IBM, already had works councils in place.

=== 2006 works council election ===
On 21 June 2006, 65% of SAP's 10,800 employees voted among ten different candidate lists, with over 400 employees standing in total. This resulted in the establishment of a 37-person Works Council, with Wir für Dich (We for You) receiving 16 seats, MUT receiving 11 seats, (Note: MUT stands for Menschenverstand, Unternehmenskultur und Transparent (Common sense, Corporate culture and Transparency)) Die Unabhängigen (The Independents), ABS and Pro Betriebsrat (Pro Works Council) receiving 3 seats each, and TEAM receiving 1 seat. Four other lists did not receive enough votes to win any seats. The three colleagues who initiated the election process were on the Pro Betriebsrat list.

Later, in December, management promoted a unified works council election across SAP Germany. At SAP Systems Integration (SI), separate elections were held at all 6 locations in Germany. In 2008, SAP SI merged with SAP Germany, resulting in a single works council.

=== 2022 works council election ===
In the works council election on 5 May 2022, 15 out of 45 seats, or one-third went to the IG Metall and ver.di trade union lists. Both works council chair positions were held by union representatives for the first time in SAP history. Eberhard Schick from the IG Metall affiliated Pro Mitbestimmung (Pro Codetermination) list was elected as works council chair, and Anne Schmitz of the ver.di affiliated Upgrade list as deputy chair.

=== 2026 works council election ===
In the works council election in March 2026, the 45 seats were distributed among 10 different lists. 11 seats went to the IG Metall affiliated Pro Mitbestimmung, 8 seats to MUT & Stark, (Note: MUT stands for Menschenverstand, Unternehmenskultur und Transparent (Common sense, Corporate culture and Transparency)) 7 seats to Wir für Dich (We for You), 5 seats to "Triple E", 5 seats to ver.di affiliated Pro Betriebsrat (Pro Works Council). The remaining 5 lists got 1 or 2 seats each.

=== Supervisory Board ===
In 1989, one year after SAP went public, it organised Supervisory Board elections as required under the German Codetermination Act. The two elected employee representatives on the board were Gerhard Maier and Bernhard Koller. In the 1993 elections, the union reserved seats went to the Christian Metalworkers' Union.

Prior to 2014, SAP was legally structured as an Aktiengesellschaft (AG) with a Supervisory Board comprising 16 seats. In accordance with the Codetermination Act, half of these seats were reserved for the employer and the other eight for employees, including two for trade union representatives, who are usually not SAP employees. Subsequently, SAP converted into a Societas Europaea (SE), or European Company. Similar to the German Codetermination Act, the European Union Employee Involvement Directive requires employee representation on the Supervisory Board. Currently, SAP SE has 18 seats across Europe, with half reserved for employees.

In the 2024 Supervisory Board election, two affiliates of the German Trade Union Confederation (DGB) were elected to the Supervisory Board, ending a four-year absence for both IG Metall and ver.di. Eberhard Schick, the works council chair, was elected to the supervisory board via the IG Metall mandate, while ver.di member Andreas Hahn was elected via the European employee representative mandate.

==== Court rulings ====
The German Federal Labour Court referred in 2020, a question to the European Court of Justice (C-677/20), whether German legislation on trade union representation in Supervisory Boards is compatible with Article 4 of the Employee Involvement Directive, specifically whether distinct elections for employee representatives and trade union representatives must be maintained. The Court Advocate-General agreed that national laws with regards to trade union representatives and electoral procedures remained applicable even after the conversion of an Aktiengesellschaft into a European Company.

A provision in the agreement between SAP and the Special Negotiation Body for the new SE Works Council would allow for SAP to reduce the Supervisory Board to 12 seats, of which six are reserved for employees, four in Germany specifically. While trade unions ver.di and IG Metall would continue to be able to nominate representatives, they would no longer be able to hold separate elections as previously done in the German Aktiengesellschaft form.

== Israel ==
The Israeli branch of SAP is unionised under the Cellular, Internet and High-Tech Workers Union of the Histadrut trade union federation. A collective agreement signed in 2020 between SAP and Histadrut covers 800 workers in Israel.

== South Korea ==
SAP Korea is represented by the Korea Finance and Service Workers Union, which is affiliated to the Korean Confederation of Trade Unions. It was established in March 2019 during mass-layoffs with around 150 members, representing under half of the total workforce. A collective agreement was signed in 2021 after picketing and mass protests, with support from fellow union branches at Microsoft, Oracle and HP.

== See also ==
- Volkswagen and unions
- Google worker organizations
- IBM and unions
- Unionization in the tech sector

== External link ==
- Verdi SAP portal (in German)
