= IBM and unions =

Relationship between IBM and trade unions

International Business Machines Corporation, more commonly known as IBM is an American technology company that employs 300,000 people across 170 countries, primarily in the United States and India. IBM's low union density and limited union recognition is attributed to a corporate culture, that emphasizes highly individualized relationships between managers and their direct reports, and proactive avoidance of unions when managers become aware of union organizing activity.

Trade unions have limited recognition at IBM in Australia, Japan, Germany and Italy and elsewhere in Europe. There were strike actions in China, Italy and Australia against corporate restructurings and demands for higher wages. In the United States, two (now defunct) initiatives, the IBM Black Workers Alliance and IBM Workers United, were formed in the 1970s to advocate for minority representation and pay transparency. National IBM union affiliates coordinate internationally through the IBM Global Union Alliance along with their respective global union federations.

IBM is one of the largest information communication technology (ICT) employers in the European Union. Workers have established a European Works Council (EWC) in 1999. IBM's level of union recognition in the EU is comparable to the industry average, along with Microsoft and SAP. However, even within traditional union strongholds of Western Europe, IBM has been able to minimize union membership.

== Industrial composition ==
Founded in 1911 as Computing-Tabulating-Recording Company in Armonk, New York, International Business Machines Corporation, more commonly known as IBM employs more than 300,000 people in 170 countries, primarily in the United States (where it is headquartered) and India.

IBM's limited-union status is partly due to its corporate culture, which includes strong employee identification with the company and close relationships between managers and their direct reports. Former IBM executive James Cortada reports that in the late 20th century, anonymous feedback from employees allowed management to address grievances early rather than waiting for problems to arise. When management became aware of unionization efforts, investigative teams were formed to discourage unions and explore alternatives.

== Transnational ==
In 1999, IBM employees in the European Union (EU) elected a European Works Council (EWC). According to the 2023 IBM EWC agreement, any EU country with IBM employees is entitled to send at least one employee representative. The IBM EWC meets regularly twice a year.

The IBM Global Union Alliance was established by three global union federations to network the different national IBM unions affiliated to UNI Global Union, European Metalworkers' Federation and International Metalworkers' Federation. (Note: In 2012, the IMF merged with the ICEM and the ITGLWF to form the IndustriALL Global Union.)

The European Trade Union Institute conducted a research study in 2014 on transnational companies, including IBM in 23 EU countries. IBM was among the 5 largest employers in 12 countries (Note: Bulgaria, Czech Republic, Denmark, France, Hungary, Italy, Poland, Slovakia, Slovenia, Spain, Sweden and United Kingdom.) in the ICT sector. The study examined the level of industrial relations between IBM management and trade unions. On a scale of 0–5 where 0 is no union recognition and 5 is the highest form of union recognition, IBM subsidiaries in 11 different countries scored an average of 2.77, (Note: IBM subsidiaries ranked from highest to low: 4: Denmark, Hungary 3: Czech Republic, Ireland, France, Spain, Sweden, United Kingdom 1–2: Bulgaria, Slovakia, Slovenia) slightly above the ICT industry average of 2.64. This placed IBM ahead of competitors HP, Accenture, and Microsoft, but behind Atos and SAP.

== Australia ==
In 2002, after IBM Global Services Australia (GSA) and Community and Public Sector Union (CPSU) failed to negotiate a common enterprise agreement for all 3,500 employees working on a Telstra contract (half of the employees were previously direct employees of Telstra and covered under a stronger agreement). Previously, the CPSU organized two 48-hour strikes after plans were announced to fire 64 IBM GSA employees.

In April 2010 the Fair Work Australia tribunal ordered IBM Australia to bargain with the Australian Service Union (ASU) representing employees in Baulkham Hills, Sydney in a mass layoff proceeding. IBM appealed unsuccessfully, claiming that ASU was ineligible to represent these employees. 80 employees accepted collectively negotiated contracts which included defined severance packages (if laid-off), sick leave and annual pay raises.

== China ==
Over 1,000 workers at the IBM Systems Technology Co. (ISTC) factory in Shenzhen went on a 10-day wildcat strike (without union support) between 3 and 12 March 2014, after management announced the transfer of the factory to Lenovo.

The strike was part of a larger trend of labor militancy in the Guangdong province. Workers demanded higher severance packages if they left and higher salaries if they transferred to Lenovo. After 20 employees were fired, including worker representatives, most of the strikers accepted the original compensation offer by management. While the Shenzhen branch of All-China Federation of Trade Unions did not support the initial strike, it filed legal claims to reinstate the 20 fired workers.

== Germany ==
IBM Germany has a group works council, which has concluded a group works agreement on the internal use of artificial intelligence in the workplace.

The German Trade Union Confederation (DGB) has the principle of 'one trade union' per company, but in practice, its affiliates, ver.di (including its predecessors) (Note: In 2001, German Salaried Employees' Union (DAG) merged into ver.di trade union.) and IG Metall have been competing for members since the early 1990s. The two unions compete with each other and non-union lists for seats on the works council in works council elections. The unions also compete for coverage in collective bargaining. In December 2001, ver.di and IG Metall agreed to form a joint collective bargaining committee to reduce their union competition.

In the absence of regional collective agreements or high union density in the workplace, the legalistic works council structures fill the gaps on certain issues such as working time through works agreements. Company collective agreements which are negotiated directly between an employer (as opposed to an employers' association) and trade union would provide a middle ground between regional union bargaining and the more formally regulated works council framework.

In 1996, union density (the ratio of union members to non-union members) at IBM Germany was less than 10% of the workforce, regardless of membership in either IG Metall or German Salaried Employees' Union (DAG) unions. IBM Germany was a member of the Metal Employer Association (Gesamtmetall) which ratified regional collective agreements with IG Metall. These regional collective agreements include the standard 35-hour work week. In 1994, following corporate restructuring, five non-manufacturing subsidiaries of IBM Germany were created, none of which joined the Metal Employer Association, thus de facto disaffiliating from the collective agreements. Instead they each signed a separate company collective agreement with DAG union that deviated from the 35-hour work week to a longer 38-hour work week.

== Italy ==
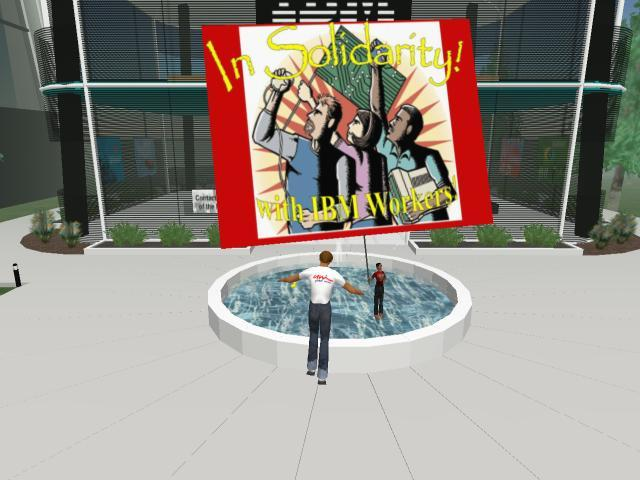
A still from the Second Life virtual strike with caption "In Solidarity with IBM workers"

Italian workplaces are locally represented through unitary representatives of trade unions (RSU) structures, which are often affiliated to national Italian trade unions.

IBM workers in Italy have been engaged in union activity since the 1970s. In the IBM 2025 RSU elections, members were elected from the Italian trade unions FIOM (CGIL), FIM (CISL) and to a smaller extent USB.

In 2007, IBM announced they would cancel a performance bonus worth $1000 per employee. RSU IBM Vimercate, which represents 9,000 IBM workers, coordinated a 'virtual strike' inside Second Life on 27 September. Second Life is a simulation software that was used both internally by IBM for its employees and for marketing to external customers.

Between 500 and 1500 real-life IBM employees across the globe signed up to disrupt IBM virtual facilities in solidarity with the Italian trade union's collective agreement negotiations. Simultaneously, in real-life, pickets were organized outside IBM Italy facilities. The virtual strike was supported by Union Network International.

One month later, on 24 October, the IBM Italy CEO resigned and the performance bonuses were reinstated, though the company claimed it was unrelated to the strikes.

== Japan ==
IBM Japan employees have been represented by Japan Metal Manufacturing, Information and Telecommunication Workers' Union (JMITU; Japanese: 日本アイビーエム支部) since 1959.

In 2019, IBM Japan rolled out internal HR software that used IBM's Watson artificial intelligence to evaluate employee compensation. According to JMITU, for a summer bonus, the software rated union members an average of 63% while non-union employees were rated 100%. The union lodged a legal complaint, alleging algorithmic discrimination. This was resolved in a 2024 collective agreement, requiring the company to disclose all 40-criteria used by the software evaluation system to the trade union. It is one of the earliest forms of AI regulations in Japan.

== United States ==
In August 1970, the IBM Black Workers Alliance (BWA) was formed. It was the first civil rights movement for high-tech workers, to protest lack of equal pay and promote opportunities for young, poor communities.

Between 1978 and 1980 its membership grew five-fold to 1,700 people. In 1980, IBM fired four of the top eight BWA officers, including one who was dismissed for distributing salary pay-bands. BWA existed until the early 1990s and had chapters in Atlanta, Cincinnati, Hudson Valley, New York City, and Washington DC. They were not a union, nor trying to form one, but one member, Marceline Donaldson, started organizing with the all Black Pullman Porters Union until she left IBM in 1979. In 1980, Donaldson filed a complaint with the NLRB and the EEOC alleging unfair labor practices and retaliation against Black employees joining the BWA chapter in Cincinnati.

In the 1970s, Lee Conrad founded the IBM Workers United (IBMWU) in Endicott, NY as an independent grassroots union. It had an underground newsletter called "Resistor" which highlighted IBM's sale of computers to apartheid South Africa, comparing them to IBM's sale of computers to the Nazis. In the 1970s, members of IBMWU distributed fliers at an IBM shareholder meeting titled "Would IBM have Sold Computers to Hitler?" protesting IBM's business with apartheid South Africa.

In 1999, IBMWU affiliated to the Communications Workers of America (CWA), rebranding itself as Alliance@IBM under CWA Local 1701, with Conrad as its lead coordinator. In 2016, Alliance@IBM shut down, citing low membership, outsourcing and union busting.
