= Swedish Pharmacists Association =

Trade union in Sweden

Swedish Pharmacists Union
- Swedish Pharmacists Association
- Sveriges Farmaceuter
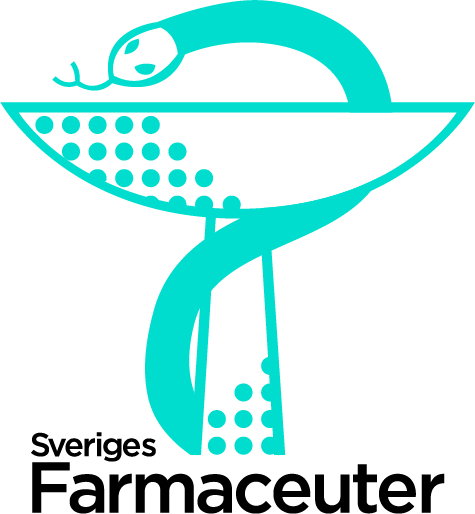
- Founded: 1903
- Headquarters: Stockholm, Sweden
- Location: Sweden
- Members: 7,100
- Affiliations: TCO

The Swedish Pharmacists Union or Swedish Pharmacists Association (Swedish: Sveriges Farmaceuter) is a trade union in Sweden for university graduates in Pharmacy. Established in 1903, it has a membership of 7100 as of November 2024.

== Leadership ==
=== CEOs ===
Jenny Harlin	May 2016	August 2019
Martina Perzanowska	August 2019	April 2020
Eva Arlander	April 2020	January 2021
Martina Perzanowska	January 2021	September 2021
Martin Östberg	September 2021	Incumbent

== Sources ==
=== Prints ===
- Kjellberg, Anders (2017) The Membership Development of Swedish Trade Unions and Union Confederations Since the End of the Nineteenth Century (De svenska fackförbundens och centralorganisationernas medlemsutveckling sedan slutet av 1800-talet) (Studies in Social Policy, Industrial Relations, Working Life and Mobility). Research Reports 2017:2 (uppdaterad 2018). Lund: Department of Sociology, Lund University. (om medlemsutvecklingen i bland annat Sveriges Farmaceuter)
