= TCO Certified =

Certification mark

- The TCO Certified mark can be found on certified computer monitors and other electronics.
- Founded: 1992; 34 years ago
- Founder: Swedish Confederation of Professional Employees (TCO)
- Area served: Globally
- Parent: Swedish Confederation of Professional Employees (TCO)
- Website: tcocertified.com

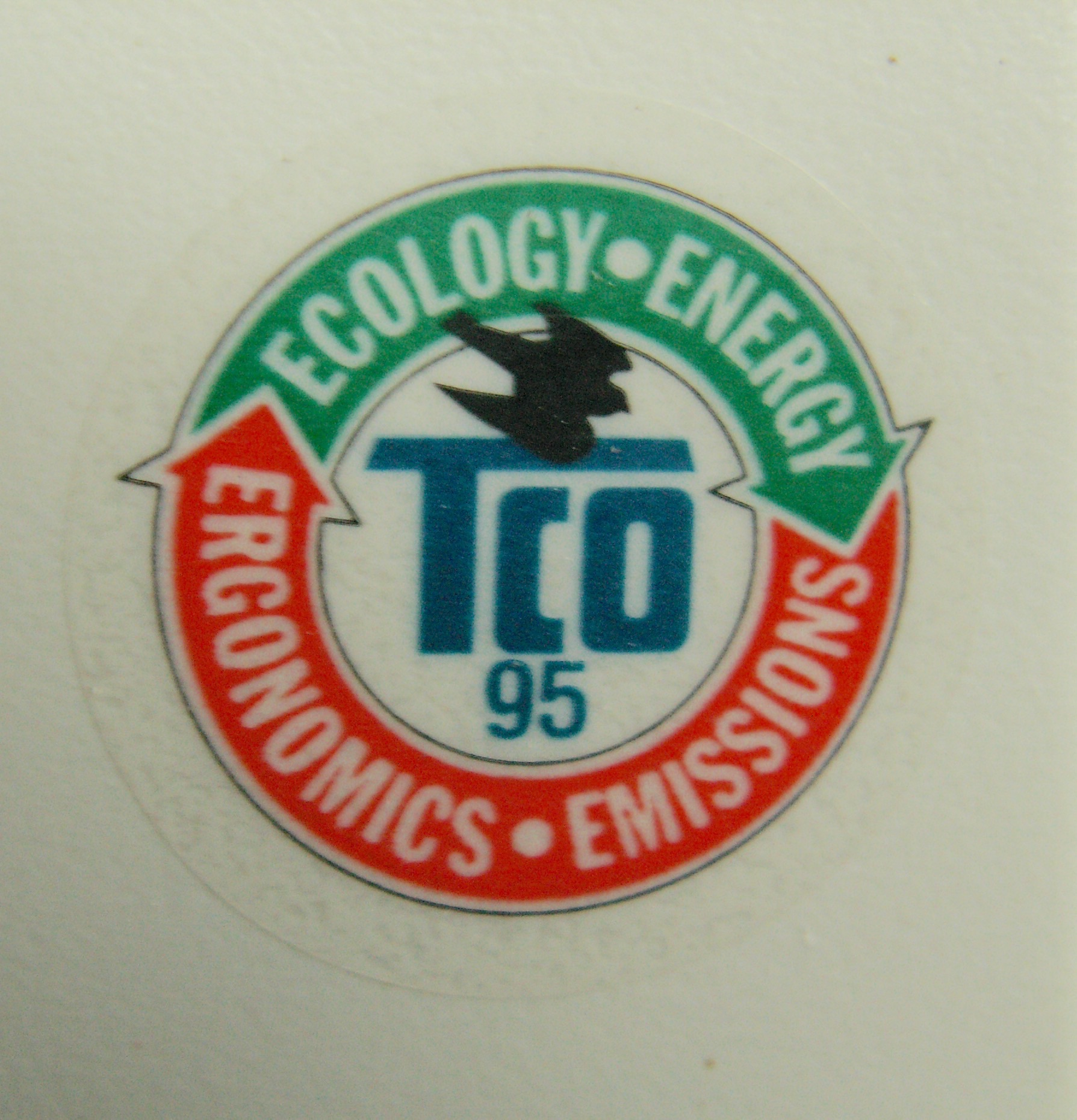
TCO’95 logo.

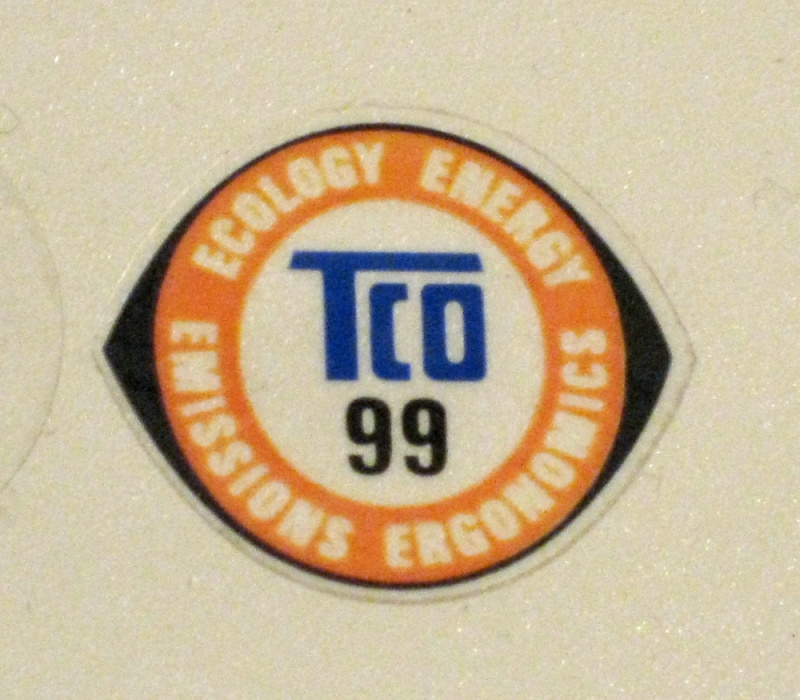
TCO’99 logo.

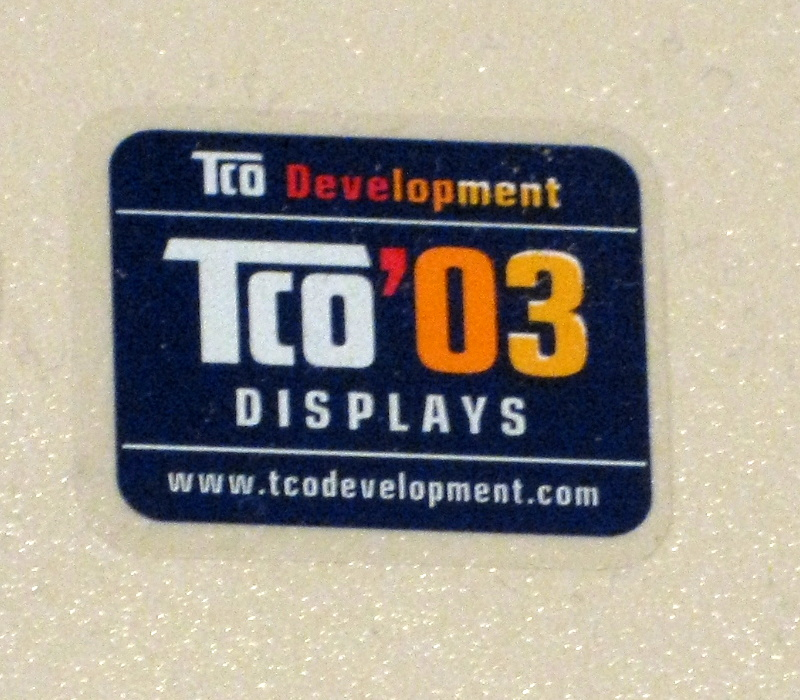
TCO’03 logo.

The TCO Certified certification was initially created by the Swedish Confederation of Professional Employees (TCO) to guarantee that computer products purchased by employers maintain ecological standards and are sufficiently ergonomic to prevent long term health issues for users. It became known during the 1990s as a certification for computer displays. Dating back to 1992, TCO is one of the oldest certifications for end user electronics.

== History ==
In the early 1980s, the Swedish Confederation of Professional Employees (TCO), a worker's union, foresaw that computers would become an important work utility and sought to establish ergonomic and radiation standards for computer displays to protect their members from health issues by daily use. Back then, the increasing use of computers and monitors in white collar work environments caused widespread complaints from employees experiencing visual fatigue and visual stress during after-work hours (also called "VDU sickness") due to extensive use of visual display units. In fact, early generations of computer displays were frequently related to eye strains and headache due to flickering, jitter and radiation. In 1986, TCO published a basic list of requirements and test protocols to verify if a display was fit for continuous daily use as a help for employers to choose the right hardware for work places.

The test became an early success and was translated into multiple languages and used also by unions in other countries to push for a more ergonomic work environment. The success of the display checklist resulted in the foundation of TCO Certified, a spin-off by the TCO Union headed by Per Erik Boivie and Peter Magnusson, among others, with the goal of creating an international certification and standards to be implemented directly by manufacturers. Starting with TCO'92 in 1992, the TCO certification minimum standards for emissions, jittering and electronic safety for computer monitors. Later on, the standards into other product categories such as peripherals and the computer itself.

== TCO Certified requirements ==
TCO publishes new guidelines every 3 to 4 years. The standards expanded from covering only computer monitors in 1992 to a wide array of devices today.

== Product categories ==
TCO Certified is available for the following products: displays, notebooks, tablets, smartphones, desktops, all-in-one PCs, projectors, headsets, and data center products: network equipment, data storage products and servers.
