= Carlo Parietti =

Italian journalist (1950–2022)

- Born: May 10, 1950; Tonco (Asti)
- Died: 22 January 2022 (aged 71–72); Rome, Italy
- Occupations: Journalist; Trade unionist

Carlo Parietti (1950 – 22 January 2022) was an Italian journalist and trade unionist. He was known for covering syndicalist activities, leading him to participate in multiple trade unions after 1979. He was president of Eurocadres from 2005 to 2013.

== Biography ==
Parietti grew up in Turin, where he studied literature and philosophy. In 1976, he began a career as a journalist, writing articles for various daily newspapers and magazines. He joined the Italian General Confederation of Labour (CGIL) in 1979 and was elected to the confederation's executive committee in 1982. In 1984, he was elected secretary-general of the Sindacato Nazionale Ricerca, where he took part in the development and implementation of an agreement for public research.

From 1989 to 1994, Parietti directed the press office of CGIL. In 1997, he was elected President of AgenQuadri, a union affiliated with CGIL. In 2001, he became vice-president of Eurocadres and subsequently served as its president from 2005 to 2013.

Parietti died in Rome on 22 January 2022.
