= TULL-KUST =

Swedish trade union

- Trade Union of Customs and Coast Guard Employees
- Förbundet för anställda i Tullverket och Kustbevakningen
- Founded: 28 July 1899
- Headquarters: Stockholm
- Location: Sweden
- Members: 1,795 (2018)
- Key people: Johan Lindgren, President
- Affiliations: TCO
- Website: www.tullkust.se

TULL-KUST (Swedish: Förbundet för anställda i Tullverket och Kustbevakningen) is a trade union that organises employees in the customs service and coast guard of Sweden.
