= Swedish Association of Health Professionals =

Trade union in Sweden

Vårdförbundet
- Swedish Association of Health Professionals
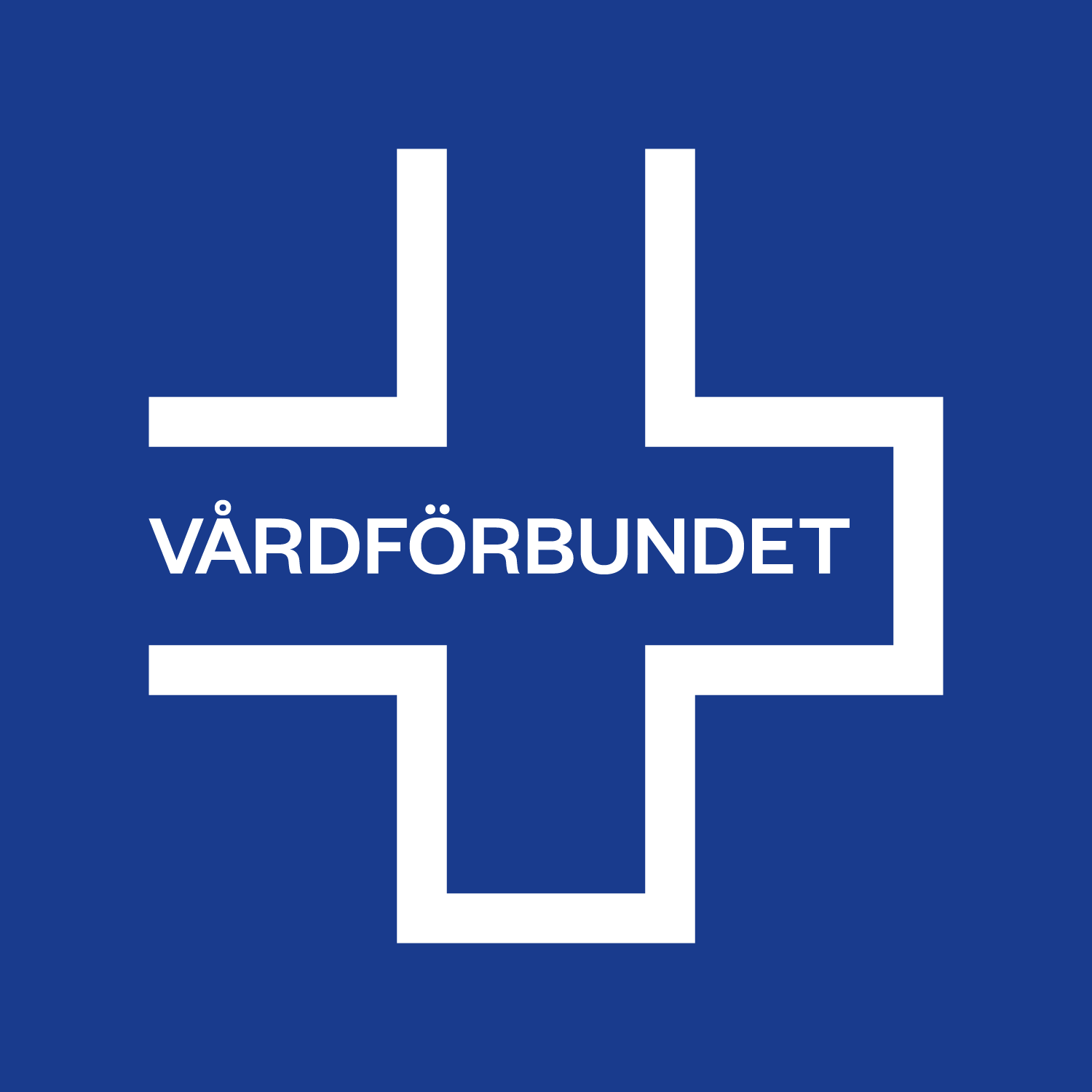
- Founded: 29 January 1965
- Headquarters: Stockholm
- Location: Sweden
- Members: 92,083(2018)
- Affiliations: TCO, PSI, ICN
- Website: www.vardforbundet.se

The Swedish Association of Health Professionals (Vårdförbundet) is a trade union with a membership of 114,000 representing nurses, midwives, biomedical scientists and radiographers.
