= SAP NetWeaver Developer Studio =

Integrated development environment

The SAP NetWeaver Developer Studio (NWDS) is an integrated development environment (IDE) for most of the Java part of SAP technology, mainly building business web applications, but also creating SAP Enterprise Portal projects and SAP Interactive Forms by Adobe. The official abbreviation Developer Studio is used seldom whereas NWDS is common, but unofficial.

The Developer Studio is based on Eclipse, contains several plug-ins and provides a range of toolsets for SAP technology such as for example

- the Web Dynpro design time tools, e.g. the application modeler for visual definition of relations between the parts of a Web Dynpro application.
- the Java Dictionary, which offers convenient definition of data types including enumeration, metadata and value range restrictions, that may be used in Web Dynpro applications or to create a database table in the system database used in J2EE applications.
- graphical tools for the development of JEE applications.
- LiveCycle Designer for WYSIWYG-near creation of SAP Interactive Forms by Adobe.
- tooling for Business Process Management and Business Rules Management (since NetWeaver CE 7.1 EHP 1).
- tooling for the provisioning, consumption, discovery and configuration of web services.

The Developer Studio is integrated into the SAP Java development infrastructure, which is a central system providing several platform services and synchronizes all local Developer Studios.

Among the platform services are the software logistics for reliable transport from development up to production systems and the component build service (CBS). CBS automatically builds changed development components (DCs) and only upon successful build, transport and deployment is possible - hence, inconsistency are detected immediately and nightly builds are not required.

Synchronization is supported for so-called development configurations, ensuring identical configuration for a track (roughly a single software project) on all local machines, source code by the designtime repository (DTR) and several other aspects.

== See also ==
- NetWeaver for more information on the platform
- List of Eclipse-based software
