= Heike Erkers =

Swedish trade unionist

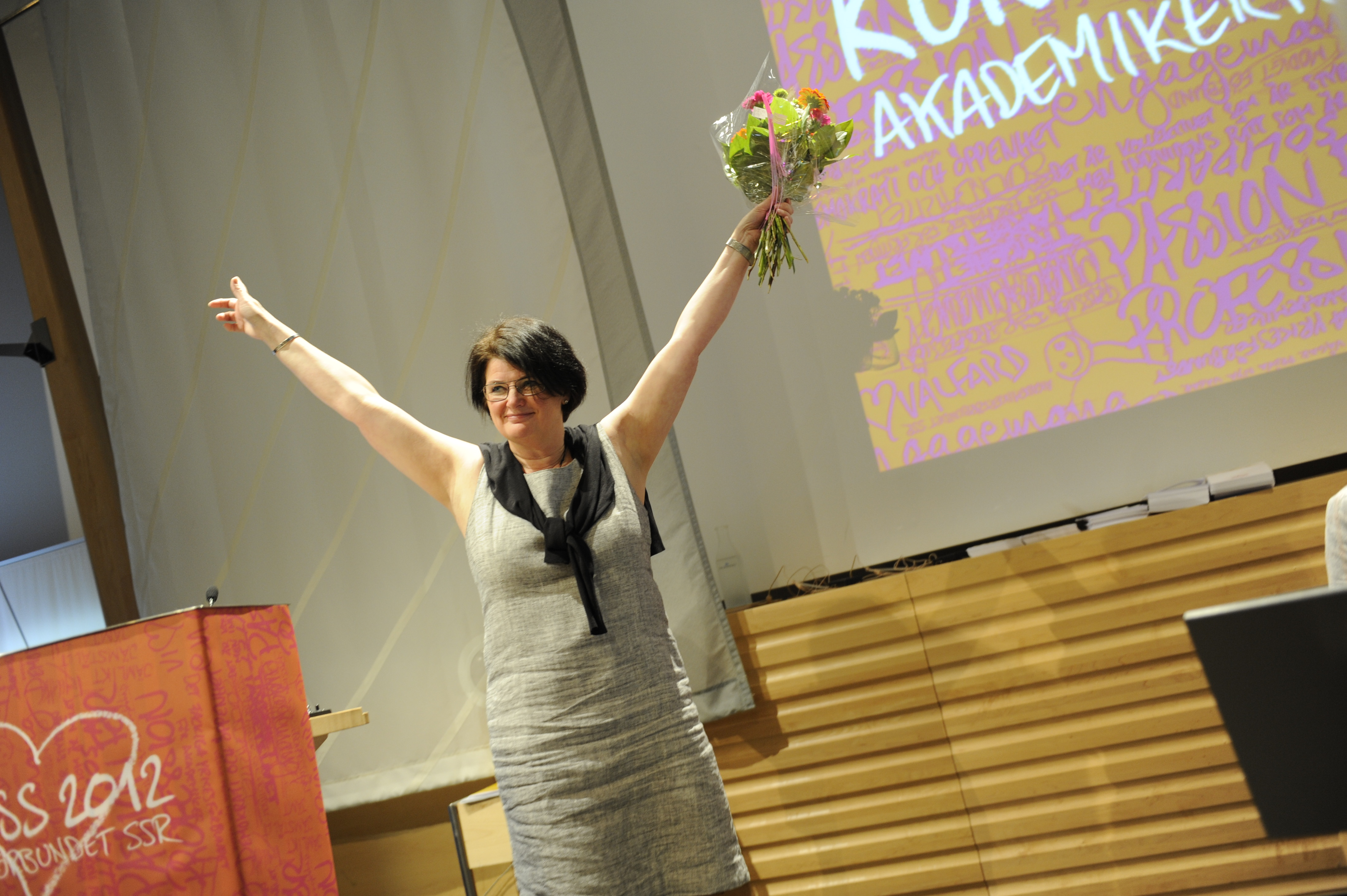
Erkers elected as a new chair of Akademikerförbundet SSR in 2012

Heike Erkers is the Chair of the Swedish labour union Akademikerförbundet SSR (English, "The Union for Professionals").

Heike Erkers started being in engaged in labour union issues in the 1990s. In 2003 she was elected member of the board of Akademikerförbundet SSR, she became First Vice-Chair in 2006, and on 13 May 2012 she was elected Chair.

As Chair of Akademikerförbundet SSR, Heike Erkers has, among other things, argued in favour of the value of employers performing salary surveys (lönekartläggning) on a regular basis. Another issue is child poverty. She is also a member of the Executive Committee of the European Federation of Public Service Unions (EPSU)
