= Financial Sector Union of Sweden =

Trade union in Sweden

Finansförbundet
- Financial Sector Union of Sweden
- Founded: 1887
- Headquarters: Stockholm, Sweden
- Location: Sweden
- Members: 25,027
- Affiliations: TCO, UNI
- Website: www.finansforbundet.se

The Financial Sector Union (Swedish: Finansförbundet) is a Swedish trade union representing workers in banks and other parts of the financial sector. Originally founded in 1887 as Svenska Bankmannaföreningen, its present name was adopted in 1994. As of December 2023, the union has a membership of 25,027, of which 14,578 (58.2%) are women.
