= Swedish Union of Commercial Salaried Employees =

Trade union in Sweden

HTF
- Swedish Union of Commercial Salaried Employees
- Tjänstemannaförbundet
- Founded: 26 September 1937
- Headquarters: Stockholm, Sweden
- Location: Sweden
- Members: 160,000
- Affiliations: TCO, UNI, IUF, ITF
- Website: www.htf.se

The Swedish Union of Commercial Salaried Employees (Swedish: Tjänstemannaförbundet HTF) was a trade union in Sweden. It had a membership of 160,000 and represented workers in a variety of industries, ranging from wholesaling, transport, freight forwarding, civil aviation and travel agencies to retailing, media companies and private dental practice.

The union was founded on 26 September 1937, with the merger of the Swedish Association of Office Employees and the recently formed Swedish Association of Shop Assistants, although the second union left again almost immediately. In 1941, it set up the country's first state-backed unemployment fund for white-collar workers. On founding, it had 9,118 members, and this fluctuated through various splits and mergers. In the long-term, membership increased significantly, reaching a peak of 158,039 in 2003.

The unions to merge into the HTF were the Swedish Association of Shipping Office Employees in 1937, the National Association of Ironmongers' Assistants in 1938, the National Association of Milk Markers in 1947, the Swedish Association of Shop and Office Employees, and the Swedish Association of Book-sellers' Assistants, both in 1951, the Staff Association of the Retail Shops Selling Wines and Spirits in 1954, the private sector employees from the Swedish Union of Dental Nurses and the Swedish Union of Dental Technicians in 1957, and the Union of Hotel and Restaurant Employees, in 1962. The splits were the Association of Female Office Employees in Stockholm in 1942, the Association of Office Employees in Norrköping and the Association of Office Employees in Gothenburg in 1943, the Swedish Association of Shop and Office Employees in 1948, and the Association of Swedish Air Personnel in 1974.

HTF was affiliated with the Swedish Confederation of Professional Employees, Union Network International, the International Union of Food, Agricultural, Hotel, Restaurant, Catering, Tobacco and Allied Workers' Association, and the International Transport Workers' Federation.

In 2008, the union merged with the Swedish Union of Clerical and Technical Employees in Industry to form Unionen.
