= Swedish Confederation of Professional Associations =

Swedish trade union federation

Saco
- Swedish Confederation of Professional Associations
- Sveriges akademikers centralorganisation
- Founded: 1947
- Headquarters: Stockholm, Sweden
- Location: Sweden
- Members: 960,000
- Key people: Göran Arrius, president
- Affiliations: ITUC, ETUC
- Website: www.saco.se

The Swedish Confederation of Professional Associations (Swedish: Sveriges Akademikers Centralorganisation, Saco) is a confederation of 21 independent professional associations in Sweden. It gathers some 960,000 members, all of whom are academics or graduate professionals with a university or college degree. The members include economists, lawyers, architects, graduate engineers, doctors, scientists, teachers and many others. A growing share of Swedish union members are affiliated to a Saco union: 1% in 1950 and 18% in 2018 (pensioners and students excluded).

The organisation does not form affiliations with political parties.

== Associations ==
1. Association of Architects (Sveriges Arkitekter)
2. Association of Graduate Engineers (Sveriges Ingenjörer)
3. Association of Business Professionals and Economists, Lawyers, Social Scientists, IT-academics, HR-professionals and Communication Specialists (Akavia)
4. Association of Graduates in Documentation, Information and Culture (DIK-förbundet)
5. Swedish Association of Graduates in Public Administration and Social Work (Akademikerförbundet SSR)
6. Association of Head Teachers and Directors of Education (Sveriges Skolledare)
7. Association of Military Officers (Officersförbundet)
8. Association of Military Officers in the Reserve (Sveriges Reservofficersförbund)
9. Association of Occupational Therapists (Sveriges Arbetsterapeuter)
10. Association of Physiotherapists (Fysioterapeuterna)
11. Association of Scientists (Naturvetarna)
12. Association of University Teachers and Researchers (SULF)
13. Association of Church of Sweden Employees (Kyrkans Akademikerförbund)
14. National Union of Teachers in Sweden (Sveriges Lärare)
15. SRAT (associations of professional employees)
16. Swedish Dental Association (Sveriges Tandläkarförbund)
17. Swedish Medical Association (Sveriges Läkarförbund)
18. Swedish Pharmacists Association (Sveriges Farmaceuter)
19. Swedish Psychological Association (Psykologförbundet)
20. Swedish Ship Officers' Association (Sjöbefälsföreningen)
21. Swedish Veterinary Association (Sveriges Veterinärförbund)

== See also ==
- Swedish Federation of Salaried Employees in Industry and Services (PTK)
- Swedish Public Employees' Negotiation Council (OFR)
- Swedish Confederation of Professional Employees (TCO)
