= SAP NetWeaver Visual Composer =

Software modelling tool

Visual Composer for SAP NetWeaver 7.0
- Developer: SAP AG
- Stable release: SAP NetWeaver 7.0 SP 12 / April, 2007
- Type: Software modelling
- Website: Visual Composer Home Page - SAP Developer Network

SAP NetWeaver Visual Composer is SAP’s web-based software modelling tool. It enables business process specialists and developers to create business application components, without coding.

Visual Composer produces applications in a declarative form, enabling code-free execution mode for multiple runtime environments. It provides application lifecycle support by maintaining the connection between an application and its model throughout its lifecycle. Visual Composer is designed with an open architecture, which enables developers to extend its design-time environment and modelling language, as well as to integrate external data services.

The tool aims to increase productivity by reducing development effort time, and narrowing the gap between application definition and implementation.

Starting with a blank canvas, the Visual Composer user, typically a business process specialist, draws the application in Visual Composer Storyboard (workspace), without writing code, to prototype, design and produce applications.

A typical workflow for creating, deploying and running an application using Visual Composer is:

Create a model

- Discover data services and add them to the model
- Select necessary UI elements and add them to the model
- Connect model elements to define the model logic and data flow

Edit the layout

- Arranging the UI elements and the controls of the application on forms and tables.

Deploy the model

- This step includes compilation, validation and deployment to a selected environment.

Run the application

- The application can run using different runtime environment (such as Adobe Flex and HTML). In 2014 a runtime environment was introduced that is utilizing HTML5 capabilities of SAPUI5.

== See also ==
- SAP AG
- NetWeaver
- Modelling language
