= Police Union (Sweden) =

Trade union in Sweden

Polisförbundet
- Police Union
- Polisförbundet
- Founded: 1903
- Headquarters: Stockholm
- Location: Sweden
- Members: 18,500
- Key people: Jan Karlsen, president
- Affiliations: TCO, EuroCOP
- Website: www.polisforbundet.se

The Police Union or Police Association (Swedish: Polisförbundet) is a police union in Sweden founded in 1903. As of 2024, it has a membership of 24,000, including 90 percent of employed police officers, plus students in training.

Dagens Nyheter revealed in 2024 that there had been more than 500 reports of police officers leaking secret information since 2018, leading the president of the Police Union, Katharina von Sydow, to state that it was unacceptable for police to associate with known criminals.
