= Akademikerförbundet SSR =

Trade union in Sweden

- Akademikerförbundet SSR
- Members: 81,000
- Key people: Heike Erkers, President
- Affiliations: Saco, PSI, EPSU
- Website: akademssr.se

Akademikerförbundet SSR (SSR derived from the original organisation "Sveriges Samhällsvetares/Socionomers Riksförbund") also known as The Union for Professionals in English is the Swedish association for university graduates in public administration, social science, political science, behavioral science, human resource management or social work. The union organizes more than 81,000 members in both the public and private sectors. The organisation consists of more than 300 local and regional organisations with one national office based in Stockholm.

An updated code of ethics published in 2006 stressed the union's commitment to "ethical traits of character". The union is critical of the political mismanagement of Sweden's social insurance system and has launched campaigns to reform the system. The union also takes the position that those who work in social services have extremely heavy workloads and as a result of poor working conditions, the quality of service is reduced.
