= Swedish Musicians' Union =

Trade union in Sweden

Musikerförbundet
- Swedish Musicians' Union
- Musikerförbundet
- Founded: 19 December 1907
- Headquarters: Stockholm
- Location: Sweden
- Members: 3,000
- Key people: Jan Granvik, president
- Affiliations: LO
- Website: www.musikerforbundet.se

The Swedish Musicians' Union (Swedish: Musikerförbundet, Musikerna) is a trade union representing musicians in Sweden.

The union was founded on 19 December 1907 in Stockholm, with about 700 members. It grew very slowly until World War II, but this changed after it joined the Swedish Trade Union Confederation in 1939. It moved from 1,954 members in 1938, to 13,240 in 1946.

The Association of Stage and Film and the Swedish Notary Writers' Association joined its ranks in 1942, followed in 1948 by the Stockholm Film and Theatre Workers' Union. In 1952, the cinema section of the Swedish Municipal Workers' Union joined in, followed in 1965 by the Association of Swedish Chamber Musicians and the Association of Musical Artists. The Swedish Dance Teachers' Union also joined in 1965, but in 1970 it transferred to the Swedish Teachers' Union. Finally, in 1971, the Association of Patrolmen joined, while in 1984 the Swedish Union of Professional Musicians split away.

The union's peak membership was 17,389 in both 1956 and 1958. It has since fallen steadily, and in 2019 stood at 2,223.
