= SAP NetWeaver Process Integration =

Component of SAP NetWeaver

SAP NetWeaver Process Integration (SAP PI) is SAP's enterprise application integration (EAI) software, a component of the NetWeaver product group used to facilitate the exchange of information among a company's internal software and systems and those of external parties. Before the current version, SAP PI was called SAP Exchange Infrastructure (SAP XI). Like other NetWeaver components, SAP PI is compatible with software products of other companies.

SAP calls PI an integration broker because it mediates between entities with varying requirements in terms of connectivity, format, and protocols. According to SAP, PI reduces the TCO by providing a common repository for interfaces. The central component of SAP PI is the SAP Integration Server, which facilitates interaction between diverse operating systems and applications across internal and external networked computer systems.

PI is built upon the SAP Web Application Server.

First release of SAP Exchange Infrastructure was XI 2.0. Later on, releases 3.0, 7.0, 7.1, 7.1 EHP1, 7.3 and 7.31 followed. From release 7.0 onwards, SAP Exchange Infrastructure has been renamed as SAP Process Integration (SAP PI).

== Single Sign-On ==
SAP NetWeaver PI allows for Single Sign-On through SAP Logon Tickets and x.509 certificates. Certificates allow for the usage of Secure Network Communications (SNC) and Secure Sockets Layer (SSL).

== Brief history of SAP PI ==
Release	Release to Customer (General Release)	End of Maintenance
Exchange Infrastructure - XI 2.0	16.12.2002 (16.05.2003)	31.12.2006
Exchange Infrastructure - XI 3.0	31.03.2004 (01.01.2005)	31.03.2010
Process Integration - PI 7.0	24.10.2005 (06.06.2006)	31.12.2017
Process Integration - PI 7.1	14.12.2007 (25.07.2008)	31.12.2020
Process Integration - PI 7.11 (EHP1)	20.03.2009 (31.07.2009)	31.12.2020
Process Integration - PI 7.30	29.11.2010 (30.05.2011)	31.12.2020
Process Orchestration - 7.31 (EHP1)	21.11.2011 (16.05.2012)	31.12.2020
Process Orchestration - 7.4	10.05.2013 (10.05.2013)	31.12.2020
Process Orchestration - 7.5	20.10.2015 (20.10.2015)	31.12.2027 (with possible extension to 31.12.2030)

== See also ==
- Comparison of business integration software
- Single Sign-On
- Secure Sockets Layer
- Secure Network Communications
- SAP Logon Ticket
