= Eurocadres =

EUROCADRES is the Council of European Professional and Managerial Staff. It is an organisation associated to the European Trade Union Confederation (ETUC). EUROCADRES is recognised by the European Commission as a European social partner.

EUROCADRES covers both the public and private sectors and uniting more than 5 million professional and managerial staff.

In 2016 Eurocadres initiated the campaign platform WhistleblowerProtection.EU, which successfully campaigned for a whistleblower protection in the European Union. 89 organisations participated in the platform, including civil society organizations such as Transparency International and several national and European trade union organisations.

The current President is Nayla Glaise (from UGICT-CGT the French Union générale des ingénieurs, cadres et techniciens CGT) elected in October 2021 to replace Martin Jefflén (from TCO, the Swedish Confederation of Professional Employees), elected in 2013 to replace fr:Carlo Parietti (from the Italian General Confederation of Labour). Carlo Parietti was elected in 2005 to replace the founder President fr:Michel Rousselot (from the Confédération Française Démocratique du Travail).
