= Forena =

Trade union in Sweden

- Forena
- Predecessor: FTF
- Headquarters: Stockholm, Sweden
- Location: Sweden
- Members: 13,024 (2018)
- Key people: Anders Johansson, chairman
- Affiliations: TCO
- Website: www.forena.se forena

Forena is a trade union in Sweden with a membership of 13,000 which organises workers in the insurance sector.
