= Swedish Union of Professional Musicians =

Swedish trade union for professional musicians

- Sveriges Yrkesmusikerförbund
- Founded: 2 September 1984; 42 years ago
- Headquarters: Stockholm
- Members: 1,447 (2018)
- Affiliations: TCO
- Website: www.symf.se

The Swedish Union of Professional Musicians (Swedish: Sveriges Yrkesmusikerförbund - SYMF) is a trade union that will organise professional singers and musicians. The union emerged as a split from the Swedish Musicians' Union (SMF) in the mid-1980's to solely represent musicians with employment contracts (as opposed to freelance musicians). SYMF and SMF jointly negotiate a national collective agreement with the Swedish employers' group, Swedish Performing Arts, which covers wages, insurance, copyright and pensions.
