= Association of Internet Workers =

Trade union of internet platform workers in Serbia

Miran Pogacar
- Association of Internet Workers
- Udruženje radnika na internetu
- Location: Serbia
- Key people: Miran Pogačar, President
- Website: uri.rs

The Association of Internet Workers (URI; Serbian: Udruženje radnika na internetu), is a trade union of internet-based platform workers in Serbia.

== History ==
The union was formed in late 2020 in response to a proposed restructuring of tax and social contributions, especially regarding work done on the internet for foreign companies, that would have left platform workers with a very high debt. Workers first set up a Facebook page with over 13,000 members and then later the formal union structure. They demanded a new legal definition for platform workers within a "reasonable" framework.

The first two large protests took place on December 30 and January 16. Later in January, the union contacted the Serbian Ombudsman to negotiate with the tax administration.

On March 31, the government announced it had come to an agreement with a rival union that had not publicly been involved in the process up until then. On April 7, hundreds of URI workers camped in front of the Serbian Parliament building.

After negotiations with the government until April 2021, the tax proposal was somewhat changed, but still not enough to meet the union's demands. Throughout this time, the union declined offers for cooperation from several Serbian political parties. They did receive support from Serbia's two biggest unions. URI and the government came to an agreement in late April.
