= Hong Kong Information Technology Workers' Union =

Trade union of IT professionals in Hong Kong

HKITWU
- Hong Kong Information Technology Workers' Union
- 香港資訊科技界工會
- Founded: 2019
- Dissolved: September 2021
- Location: Hong Kong
- Members: 1,100 (2020)
- Key people: Alex Tang, Founder; Deng Zhuowen, Chairman
- Affiliations: Hong Kong Confederation of Trade Unions
- Website: https://hkitwu.org/ Official Website

The Hong Kong Information Technology Workers' Union (HKITWU; Chinese: 香港資訊科技界工會) was a trade union of IT workers in Hong Kong. It was affiliated with the Hong Kong Confederation of Trade Unions, which also dissolved in 2021.

== History ==
The trade union was founded during the 2019–2020 Hong Kong protests, together with other trade unions. During the protests, the trade union developed a database of employers that would not threaten or dismiss staff for taking part in the protests.

The union dissolved in 2021. Chairman Deng Zhuowen said that member numbers had plummeted by 80 to 90 percent from last year due to emigration of IT professionals from Hong Kong, caused by a state crackdown after the protests.

== External ==
- Chinese: 香港資訊科技界工會; lit. 'Hong Kong Information Technology Workers’ Union' Official Website
