= National Trade Union Confederation (Romania) =

Cartel ALFA
- National Trade Union Confederation
- Confederaţia Naţionala Sindicală
- Founded: June 1990
- Headquarters: Bucharest, Romania
- Location: Romania
- Members: 325,000
- Key people: Bogdan Hossu, president Ion Homos, secretary general
- Affiliations: ITUC, ETUC
- Website: www.cartel-alfa.ro

The National Trade Union Confederation (Cartel ALFA) is a national trade union center in Romania. It was founded June, 1990 and has a membership of 325,000.

Cartel ALFA is affiliated with the International Trade Union Confederation, and the European Trade Union Confederation.
