= Collective agreement coverage =

International measure of collective bargaining

Collective agreement coverage or union representation refers to the proportion of people in a country population whose terms and conditions at work are made by collective bargaining, between an employer and a trade union, rather than by individual contracts. This is invariably higher than the union membership rate, because collective agreements almost always protect non-members in a unionised workplace. This means that, rather than individuals who have weaker bargaining power representing themselves in negotiations, people organise to represent each other together when negotiating for better pay and conditions in their workplace. The number of people who are covered by collective agreements is higher than the number of union members (or the "union density" rate), and in many cases substantially higher, because when trade unions make collective agreements they aim to cover everyone at work, even those who have not necessarily joined for membership.

Certainly, the causes of higher or lower collective bargaining coverage can vary and are subject to debate. Some common factors that are often identified as influencing the extent of collective bargaining coverage include:

1. Legal and Regulatory Framework: The legal framework surrounding labor relations, including laws governing unionization and collective bargaining rights, can significantly impact the level of coverage. For example, countries with more permissive labor laws may see higher rates of unionization and collective bargaining coverage.
2. Economic Conditions: Economic factors such as unemployment rates, economic growth, and industry composition can influence the bargaining power of workers and unions. In times of economic prosperity, workers may have more leverage to negotiate for better wages and working conditions, leading to higher collective bargaining coverage. Conversely, during economic downturns, union membership and bargaining coverage may decrease as companies face financial pressures and workers may be more hesitant to push for concessions.
3. Labor Market Flexibility: The degree of labor market flexibility, including factors such as the prevalence of temporary or precarious employment, can affect the ability of workers to organize and engage in collective bargaining. Countries with more flexible labor markets may see lower levels of collective bargaining coverage, as workers may face greater challenges in unionizing and negotiating with employers.
4. Social and Cultural Factors: Social attitudes towards unions and collective bargaining, as well as cultural norms regarding work and labor relations, can play a significant role. In countries where unions are deeply ingrained in the social fabric and enjoy broad public support, collective bargaining coverage may be higher. Conversely, in societies where unions are viewed negatively or where individualism is valued over collective action, coverage may be lower.
5. Employer Behavior: The stance of employers towards unions and collective bargaining can also impact coverage levels. Employers' attitudes towards unionization, their willingness to engage in collective bargaining, and their use of anti-union tactics can all influence the extent to which workers are covered by collective bargaining agreements.
6. Union Strength and Tactics: The strength and tactics of labor unions themselves can affect collective bargaining coverage. Strong, well-organized unions with effective bargaining strategies are more likely to secure collective bargaining agreements and higher levels of coverage for their members.
7. Globalization and Technological Change: Globalization and technological advancements can also shape collective bargaining coverage. Changes in the structure of industries, outsourcing of jobs, and increased competition from international markets can impact the bargaining power of workers and unions, potentially leading to shifts in collective bargaining coverage.

These factors interact in complex ways and can vary significantly across countries and regions, contributing to ongoing debates about the causes and consequences of collective bargaining coverage levels.

== Causes ==
The causes of higher or lower collective bargaining coverage are widely debated. Common causes are often identified as including the following:

- whether a jurisdiction encourages sectoral collective bargaining (higher coverage) or enterprise bargaining (lower coverage)
- whether collective agreements to create a closed shop or allow automatic enrollment in union membership are lawful
- whether laws on collective bargaining and strikes are more or less favourable
- whether the government, for instance through a Ministry or Department of Labour, actively promotes collective agreement coverage with a power to impose terms if employers refuse to bargain with the workforce
- whether a country enables collective agreements to be extended by government regulations to all workers when the coverage rate reaches a majority in a sector, or similar level

== By country ==
Collective bargaining coverage in OECD countries
Country	Coverage (%)	Year
Australia	61.2	2018
Austria	98.0	2019
Belgium	96.0	2019
Canada	31.3	2020
Chile	20.4	2018
Colombia	15.7	2016
Czech Republic	34.7	2019
Denmark	82.0	2018
Estonia	19.1	2021
Finland	88.8	2017
France	98.0	2018
Germany	54.0	2018
Greece	14.2	2017
Hungary	21.8	2019
Iceland	90.0	2019
Ireland	34.0	2017
Israel	26.1	2012
Italy	100.0	2019
Japan	16.8	2019
South Korea	14.8	2018
Lithuania	26.6	2021
Latvia	27.1	2018
Luxembourg	56.9	2018
Mexico	10.4	2019
Netherlands	75.6	2019
New Zealand	18.6	2020
Norway	69.0	2017
Poland	13.4	2019
Portugal	77.2	2021
Slovak Republic	24.4	2015
Slovenia	78.6	2017
Spain	80.1	2018
Sweden	88.0	2018
Switzerland	45.0	2018
Turkey	8.5	2019
United Kingdom	26.9	2019
United States	12.1	2020
OECD average (Note: estimated value)	32.1	2019
Costa Rica (Note: non-OECD)	10.3	2019

=== Sweden ===
Collective agreement coverage in Sweden was in 2017 90% of all employees (in the private sector 83%, in the public sector 100%). In 2017 union density was 69% (64% in the private sector, 79% in the public sector).

=== United States ===
In the United States in 2015 there were 14.8m union members, and 16.4m people covered by collective bargaining or union representation. Union membership was 7.4% in private sector, but 39% in the public sector. In the five largest states, California has 15.9% union membership, Texas 4.5%, Florida 6.8%, New York 24.7% (the highest in the country), and Illinois had 15.2%.

== See also ==
- European labour law
- US labor law
- UK labour law
