= Swedish Confederation of Professional Employees =

Swedish association of trade unions

TCO
- Swedish Confederation of Professional Employees
- Tjänstemännens Centralorganisation
- Founded: 1931
- Headquarters: Stockholm
- Location: Sweden
- Members: 1.2 million (2018)
- Key people: Therese Svanström, President
- Affiliations: ITUC, ETUC, NFS
- Website: www.tco.se

The Swedish Confederation of Professional Employees (Swedish: Tjänstemännens Centralorganisation, TCO, literally "White-collar workers' Central Organisation") is a national trade union centre, the umbrella organisation for 12 trade unions in Sweden that organise professional and other qualified employees in both the private and the public sectors. The affiliated trade unions represent about 1.2 million employees. In 2018, the TCO affiliated unions made up 37% of all active trade union members in Sweden (up from 17% in 1950), making the confederation the second largest of Sweden's three major confederations. The largest TCO affiliate is Unionen with 551,000 active members in 2018. TCO is independent and not affiliated to any political party in Sweden. TCO is an affiliate of the European Trade Union Confederation and Eurocadres.

== History ==
TCO is the product of two confederations that merged in 1944. The older organisation was the Confederation of Employees (Swedish: De Anställdas Centralorganisation or DACO) founded in 1931 by seven private sector white collar unions representing 20,000 workers. The second organisation was the Swedish Confederation of Professional Employees (Swedish: Tjänstemännens Centralorganisation TCO) which was founded in January 1937 by eight public sector unions representing 38,000 workers. The two confederations merged in 1944, adopting the name TCO, bringing together 40 trade unions representing 180,000. After World War II membership in the affiliated unions grew rapidly to more than half a million by 1965.

== Affiliates and membership ==
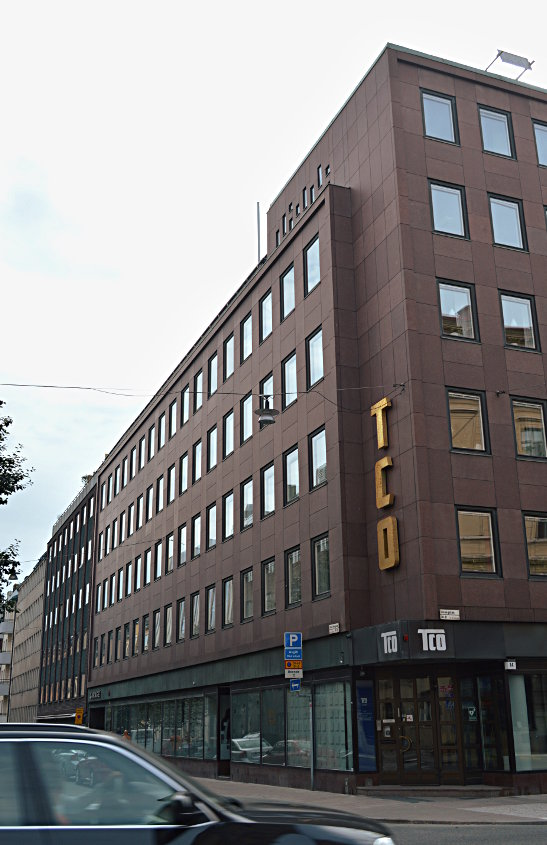
Headquarters of TCO, Linnégatan, Stockholm.

Union density in Sweden has been at one of the highest levels in the world, peaking around 85% in the mid-1980s, but since declining to around 70% in 2015. In general, the decline in union density in Sweden has been faster among blue-collar workers and slower among white-collar workers (TCO's base of membership). Between 1990 and 2015, the rate of unionisation of white-collar workers fell from 80.5% to 72%, but for blue-collar workers, the fall was from 82% to 63%.

Membership (31 December 2017)
	Active Members	Women (active)	Men (active)	Students	Retired	Change (2016 active members)
Unionen	538 845	235 892	302 953	46 406	63 888	▲1 134
Teachers' Union	168 378	140 615	27 763	30 193	35 846	▼1 841
Vision	137 082	98 246	38 836	18 258	39 625	▲3 330
Association of Health Professionals	91 272	82 254	9 018	10 513	12 534	▲1 320
Union of Civil Servants	66 923	41 488	25 435	7 935	20 356	▼178
Financial Sector Union	26 365	16 047	10 318	2 841	3 760	▼710
Police Union	18 781	6 081	12 700	1 722	2 886	▼338
Forena	13 110	7 412	5 698	103	1 200	▼107
Union of Journalists	11 484	6 033	5 451	728	2 826	▼539
Union for Theatre, Artists and Media	6 322	3 570	2 752	222	1 878	▼8
Union of Civilian Employees in the Defence Forces	2 810	1 154	1 656	0	1 124	▼11
Swedish Union of Professional Musicians	1 394	606	788	46	336	▼20
TULL-KUST	1 794	707	1 087	3	1 793	▼82
Forest and Agricultural Service Union^{[a]}	576	173	403	2	42	▼18
TOTAL	1 085 136	640 278	444 858	118 983	188 074	▲1 932
		59%	41%	8.5%	13.5%	0.2%

^{a} The Forest and Agricultural Service Union merged with Unionen on 1 June 2019.

== TCO Certified ==
TCO owns the non-profit organisation TCO Development. TCO Development owns and develops the international sustainability certification TCO Certified. TCO Certified is a sustainability certification for IT products in offices and data centers worldwide. TCO Certified is available for office IT products: displays, notebooks, tablets, smartphones, desktops, all-in-one PCs, projectors, headsets, and data center products: network equipment, data storage products and servers. Certified products must meet comprehensive environmental and social criteria throughout the life cycle. For instance, factories where certified products are made must follow criteria on working hours, working environment and wages. Products must meet criteria for energy efficiency, ergonomic design and limited hazardous substance content.

== See also ==
- Swedish Federation of Salaried Employees in Industry and Services (PTK)
- Swedish Public Employees' Negotiation Council (OFR)
- Swedish Confederation of Professional Associations (SACO)
- Swedish Trade Union Confederation (LO)
