= Joint employment (US Law) =

American law

Joint employment is the sharing of control and supervision of an employee's activity among two or more business entities.

At present, no single definition of joint employment exists. Instead, various employment laws define situations in which joint employment may occur with respect to that law.

An example is the Family and Medical Leave Act in the United States. This Act defines joint employment in determining which business entity has the legal responsibility to provide an equivalent job for an employee returning from family or medical leave.

== Background ==
Under the Fair Labor Standard Act of 1938, two or more employers can employ an individual employee at the same time, as the Act does not prevent an employee from having more than one employment relationship at the same time. If all the facts show that the two employers are not acting independently and yet the employee is jointly employed, all the work the employee does during the agreed period is considered as one employment for purposes of the Act. Therefore, both employers are responsible, individually and jointly, to comply with all provisions of the Act (such as overtime) with respect to the entire employment for the particular workweek. In discharging the joint obligation each employer may, of course, take credit toward minimum wage and overtime requirements for all payments made to the employee by the other joint employer or employers.

On July 29, 2021, the U.S. Department of Labor has rescinded and removed the Joint Employer Rule (part 791 of title 29 of the Code of Federal Regulations) in its entirety and reserved.

== Determination of joint employment ==
There are few main points to determinate whether a joint employment exists:

- Whether the two different practice employs the same member of staff
- whether each practice is associated with the other practice
- To what extent does the employer have the right to control or exercise control over the work of the employees?

It can also look at the employment contract: if it clearly states that they have more than one employer, it is more likely to be a joint-employment contract. However, if the contract of employment is only with one particular employer, even if the contract declares that the employee is required to work for another practice, it is not a joint-employment. Moreover, if the practice exercises control over the employees, even though they do not formally employ them, the practices may still be a joint employer. The more control of both employers, no matter direct or indirect, the greater chance that the courts would generally claim the employee is jointly employed, they would look at the totality of circumstances to determinate whether two entities will be considered as joint employers. In behalf of not causing any legal proceedings, the employers, should set out their responsibilities clearly in the agreement to avoid any uncertainty in the future and contract language is very important. In fact, it's possible for several different businesses to be joint employers of a single employee. The greater the number of joint employers, the more difficult for the employers to overcome some practical problems such as the arrangement of the employee and assume their responsibilities. However, since these issues are legally complex, both employers and employees should ask advice from experienced legal counsel.

Employees jointly employed by two employers must be counted by both employers, whether or not maintained on one of the employer's payroll, in determining employer coverage and employee eligibility. For example, an employer who jointly employs 20 employees from a temporary placement agency and 60 permanent workers is covered by FMLA. An employee who is working for a secondary employer in a given period is considered employed by the secondary employer, and must be counted for coverage and eligibility purposes, as long as the employer has a reasonable expectation that that employee will return to employment with that employer.

Under the joint employment circumstances, only the primary employer has the responsibility to give required notices to the employees such as providing FMLA leave, health benefits, welfare and job restoration. The secondary employer is responsible for accepting the employee returning from FMLA leave in place of the replacement employee if the secondary employer continues to utilize an employee from the temporary placement agency, and the agency chooses to place the employee with the secondary employer. A secondary employer is also responsible for compliance with the prohibited acts provisions with respect to its jointly employed employees, whether or not the secondary employer is covered by FMLA. There are a few factors which determine who is the primary employer such as the authority to employ, assign different tasks for the staffs, provide employment welfare and make payroll.

The National Labor Relations Board (NLRB) rules on joint employment status. A ruling known as the Browning-Ferris ruling was issued in 2015, but this was replaced by a new ruling in February 2020 which stated that in order to be classed as a joint employer,

a business must possess and exercise substantial direct and immediate control over one or more essential terms and conditions of employment of another employer’s employees.

== Benefits and drawbacks of joint employment ==
=== Benefits ===
The joint employers may find it easier to hire experts in some niche industries, people with specialist skills, or even replace their regular workforces. Due to the fact that joint employment is more flexible for an employee to work with different practices in a given period, they can decide which job should be prioritised. For instance, there are different deadlines for different projects, under the joint employment circumstances, the employee can adjust the pace of work for different projects, so the work can be completed before the deadlines, as well as building a good relations with other practices. In addition, some employees may also prefer working full-time under a joint contract of employment instead of part-time for different practices, therefore the employers can easier to recruit new employees to address staff shortages. Furthermore, the joint employers share control over the employee such as the work schedule. Some employers can also reduce the cost of labour and employee benefits by a joint employment contract because of the payroll costs split between the employers.

=== Drawbacks ===
Unemployment can increase as labor demand reduces due to joint employment; some practices might want to cut payroll cost by choosing a joint contract of employment. One potential risk is there could be confusion about the arrangement of an employee between two employers, so it is difficult to overcome these practical problems. In some circumstances, if two employers have completely different terms and conditions such as work schedule and sick pay, the employees might disagree on them. It is also questionable on who the employee would complain to when they have been treated unfairly. When there is a dispute, even though it was only with one of the employer, the employment tribunal claims against both employers, so it is unfair to another employer. It is necessary to draw up an agreement between the two practices to avoid future dispute and misunderstanding. The joint employers also have to determine their responsibilities as well as manage the process and make decisions in any disciplinary situation. Besides, it is unpredictable what is going to happen when one of the employer decides to end the joint employment relationship due to various reasons such as he is no longer providing the same service, or he wants to sell his business, what will be the new arrangement? Will the other employer change the employee to the normal contract or they will take on full responsibility for the employee? It depends on circumstances. For many medium to large–sized companies, understanding the role of being a joint employer is very important. A lot of large companies such as Walmart, DHL, have been prosecuted for unpaid overtime pay to the joint employer. Employers who do not fully understand joint employer status are at high risk of violation of the law such as overtime pay.
