= SAP NetWeaver =

Component of SAP systems

SAP NetWeaver is a software stack for many of SAP SE's applications. The SAP NetWeaver Application Server, sometimes referred to as WebAS, is the runtime environment for the SAP applications and all of the mySAP Business Suite runs on SAP WebAS: supplier relationship management (SRM), customer relationship management (CRM), supply chain management (SCM), product lifecycle management (PLM), enterprise resource planning (ERP), transportation management system (TMS).

The product is marketed as a service-oriented architecture for enterprise application integration. It can be used for custom development and integration with other applications and systems, and is built primarily using the ABAP programming language, but also uses C, C++, and Java. It can also be extended with, and interoperate with, technologies such as Microsoft .NET, Java EE, and IBM WebSphere.

== History ==
SAP Netweaver was invented by Doug Maulbetsch, an executive in SAP labs and former Global IT Executive of General Motors. The platform was intended to be the application architecture for SAP customers.

Its design enabled integration of the user experience, SAP applications, data analytics and interfacing of SAP and non-SAP systems.

Netweaver is depicted in the famous “Hamburger” chart that shows the layers of integration. The concept was developed in Southfield Michigan and was quickly sent to SAP labs in Palo Alto CA for approval by Hasso Platner, founder of SAP.

Netweaver's design would wrap SAP applications in an architecture that allowed integration within an enterprise and over the internet with other companies. The platform leverages SAP portal concepts and application architecture concepts from General Motors and CommerceOne.

Netweaver's original designed was as a cloud service in 2002, but only recently evolved as a subscription service called SAP Business Technology Platform (BTP). This was done as part of SAP's overall strategy to become a cloud subscription company.

Following the innovation, SAP assigned an executive to execute the implementation of Netweaver.

SAP portal portal technology developed by Israeli software company TopTier Software (founded in 1997), and which SAP acquired in 2001. The founder of TopTier Software, Shai Agassi, joined SAP and was given responsibility for the company's overall technology strategy and execution. He initiated the development of the integration and application platform that became the NetWeaver platform.

SAP announced the first release, NetWeaver 2004, in January 2003, and it was made available on March 31, 2004.

NetWeaver 7.0, also known as 2004s, was made available on October 24, 2005. The latest available release is SAP NetWeaver 7.5 SP 29.

- SAP NetWeaver Application Server
- SAP NetWeaver Business Intelligence
- SAP NetWeaver Composition Environment (CE)
- SAP NetWeaver Enterprise Portal (EP)
- SAP NetWeaver Identity Management (IdM)
- SAP NetWeaver Master Data Management (MDM)
- SAP NetWeaver Mobile
- SAP NetWeaver Process Integration (PI)

SAP has also worked with the computer hardware vendors HP, IBM, Fujitsu and Sun Microsystems (which was later acquired by Oracle Corporation) to deliver hardware and software for the deployment of NetWeaver components. Examples of these appliances include BW Accelerator and Enterprise Search.

Development tools for NetWeaver include ABAP Workbench (SE80), SAP NetWeaver Developer Studio (NWDS) based on Eclipse for most of the Java part of the technology (Web Dynpro for Java, JEE, Java Dictionary, portal applications etc.), SAP NetWeaver Development Infrastructure (NWDI) and Visual Composer.

== SAP Central Process Scheduling ==
SAP Central Process Scheduling by Redwood (SAP CPS), is an event-driven process scheduler incorporated into SAP ERP components.

SAP CPS is a component of SAP NetWeaver. It was designed to centrally automate and manage background processes and automate business applications running on SAP NetWeaver. These applications include SAP Solution Manager and SAP Closing Cockpit, which use the SAP CPS component with cross-system and non-SAP applications. SAP Business Process Automation (BPA) is a new rebranded solution that replaces SAP Central Process Scheduling by Redwood.

== See also ==
- BRFplus
- SAP Composite Application Framework – an environment for designing and using composite applications
- Web Dynpro
