= Web Dynpro =

Web application for SAP systems

Web Dynpro (WD) is a web application technology developed by SAP SE that focuses on the development of server-side business applications. For modern releases (for instance as of NetWeaver 750, software layer SAP_UI) the user interface is rendered according to the HTML5 web standard. Since Netweaver 754 (software layer SAP_UI, ABAP Platform 1909) a touch enabled user interface is available. The newly released versions usually follow the SAP Fiori design principles. One of its main design features is that the user interface is defined in an entirely declarative manner. Web Dynpro applications can be developed using either the Java (Web Dynpro for Java, WDJ or WD4J) or ABAP (Web Dynpro ABAP, WDA or WD4A) development infrastructure.

== Overview ==
The earliest version of Web Dynpro appeared in 2003 and was based on Java. This variant was released approximately 18 months before the ABAP variant. As of 2010, the Java variant of Web Dynpro was put into maintenance mode.

WD follows a design architecture based on an interpretation of the MVC design pattern and uses a model driven development approach ("minimize coding, maximize design").

The Web Dynpro Framework is a server-side runtime environment into which many dedicated "hook methods" are available. The developer then places their own custom coding within these hook methods in order to implement the desired business functionality. These hook methods belong to one of the broad categories of either "life-cycle" and "round-trip"; that is, those methods that are concerned with the life-cycle of a software component (i.e. processing that takes place at start up and shut down etc.), and those methods that are concerned with processing the fixed sequence of events that take place during a client-initiated round trip to the server.

Web Dynpro is aimed at the development of business applications that follow standardized UI principles, applications that connect to backend systems and which are scalable.

Key Capabilities

- Declarative way of development: Web Dynpro offers a graphical and declarative means of UI development. UI controls, building blocks, views and windows are modeled, and the business logic can be coded separately.
- Separation of user interface and business logic: One advantage of Web Dynpro over SAP GUI is the separation between business logic and user interface, and the structured development process with less implementation effort.
- Support of stateful application: The state of the application is kept in the back-end. This leads to a reduced data transfer from ABAP server to browser and vice versa.

Regarding Web Dynpro ABAP there is only one programming language (ABAP) and only one system necessary. Therefore, development can be easier and cost efficient.
