= Unionen =

Trade union in Sweden

- Founded: 1 January 2008
- Headquarters: Olof Palmes gata 17, Stockholm
- Location: Sweden
- Members: 649,139 (2017)
- Affiliations: Swedish Confederation of Professional Employees (TCO)
- Website: www.unionen.se

Unionen is a Swedish white-collar professionals trade union. It represents employees such as managers, engineers and economists in sectors including media, technology, commerce, energy, industry and construction. Unionen is the biggest trade union in the country and the biggest white-collar union in the world. As of 2017 it had 403,623 members on formation.

The union was formed on 1 January 2008, when the Swedish Union of Commercial Salaried Employees merged with the Swedish Union of Clerical and Technical Employees in Industry. Like both its predecessors, it affiliated to the Swedish Confederation of Professional Employees. In 2014, it was joined by the Pharmacy Union, and in 2019 by the Association of Forestal, and Agricultural Employees.

== Presidents ==
- 2008: Mari-Ann Krantz
- 2008: Cecilia Fahlberg
- 2015: Martin Linder
- 2023: Peter Hellberg
