= Union density =

Numbers registered to a union

The union density or union membership rate conveys the number of trade union members who are employees as a percentage of the total number of employees in a given industry or country. This is normally lower than collective agreement coverage rate, which refers to all people whose terms of work are collectively negotiated. Trade unions bargain with employers to improve pay, conditions, and decision-making in workplaces; higher rates of union density within an industry or country will generally indicate higher levels of trade union bargaining power, lower rates of density will indicate less bargaining power.

== Causes ==
The causes of higher or lower union membership are widely debated. Common causes are often identified as including the following:

- whether a jurisdiction encourages sectoral collective bargaining (higher coverage) or enterprise bargaining (lower coverage)
- whether collective agreements to create a closed shop or allow automatic enrollment in union membership are lawful
- whether the government, for instance, through a Ministry or Department of Labour, actively promotes collective agreement coverage with the power to impose terms if employers refuse to bargain with the workforce
- whether a country enables collective agreements to be extended by government regulations to all workers when the coverage rate reaches a majority in a sector, or to a similar level
- whether laws on collective bargaining and strikes are more or less favourable

== By country ==
| | Now | Older |
|---|---|---|
| (France) | 8% | |
| (United States) | | |
| (Sweden) | 68% | |
| (Australia) | 14.3% | |
| (Spain) | 13.7% | |

In the United States in 2015, there were 14.8 million union members and 16.4 million people covered by collective bargaining or union representation. Union membership was 7.4% in private sector, but 39% in the public sector. In the five largest states, California has 15.9% union membership, Texas 4.5%, Florida 6.8%, New York 24.7% (the highest in the country), and Illinois had 15.2%.

In December 2021, 14.3% of the Australian workforce were union members; this was a decline of more than 5 percentage points since 2010 and nearly 10 percentage points since 2005.

In Sweden union density was 68% in 2019. In all the Nordic countries with a Ghent system—Sweden, Denmark and Finland—union density is almost 70%. In all these countries union density has declined.

In France the overall union density was 9% in 2019, but with 98% covered by collective agreements. Union density is higher in companies over 50 employees.

The U.S. Bureau of Labor in 2010 noted a difference of median income of 200 dollars between union-members (917), and non-union members (717) without indicating if higher salaries link to more unionisation, or the reverse or in mutuality.

== See also ==
- Australian labour law
- European labour law
- US labor law
- UK labour law
