= Juro =

Juro may refer to:

- Juro (company), British legal technology company
- Juro Novelty Company, American toy manufacturer

== People with the name ==
- Juro Adlešič (1884–1968), Slovenian lawyer and politician
- Jūrō Gotō (1887–1984), Japanese military officer
- Juro Janosik (1688–1713), Slovak highwayman
- Jūrō Kara (1940–2024), Japanese playwright and actor
- Juro Kuvicek (born 1967), Norwegian footballer
- Jūrō Oka (1870–1923), Japanese businessman
- Juro Tkalčić (1877–1957), Croatian musician
- Kagami Jūrō (1836–1876), Japanese samurai

== See also ==
- Juru (disambiguation)
