= SpringCM =

- Type: Private
- Industry: Enterprise Content Management, Contract lifecycle management, Cloud Computing, Computer Software
- Founded: 2005
- Founders: Greg Buchholz, Jeff Piper
- Headquarters: Chicago, Illinois (United States)
- Number of locations: 4 (Chicago, San Francisco, London, & Bucharest)
- Key people: Dan Dal Degan (CEO)
- Number of employees: 51-200
- Parent: DocuSign
- Website: www.springcm.com

SpringCM is a cloud platform that manages sales contracts and all types of documents across desktop, mobile and partner applications like Salesforce. SpringCM manages the entire contract life-cycle with advanced workflows that automate manual tasks and complex processes. Built on its own cloud infrastructure platform, SpringCM is a content delivery network for performance, availability, and security.

Its corporate headquarters is located in Chicago, Illinois. In 2016, SpringCM opened two new offices in San Francisco and London, and in 2018 SpringCM opened an office in Bucharest. It has received the most 5-star reviews of any Salesforce AppExchange partner for Contract Management.

On July 31, 2018, DocuSign announced plans to acquire SpringCM for $220 million. On September 4, 2018, DocuSign acquired SpringCM Solution.

== History ==
SpringCM was founded in 2004 by Christine Marie Mason (CEO of Adexs, Inc., 2004–2007) and Greg Buchholz as DocExchange, Inc. dba SpringCM. SpringCM was a spin-out of Adexs (Automated Document Exchange Services Inc.).

In January 2006, SpringCM made its debut on the software as a service marketplace as an offshoot product based heavily upon a document sharing and compliance utility constructed for ChemCentral. SpringCM received $8 million in foundation capital from Silicon Valley–based investment capital firm Foundation Capital in third-quarter 2006, bringing the total amount of investment capital raised to $10 million.

In March 2007, SpringCM introduced SpringCM for Salesforce.com through the Salesforce.com AppExchange. Stratus Technologies announced that it chose SpringCM for contract negotiations approval in September 2007.

SpringCM also receives funding from North Bridge Venture Partners.

In 2010, SpringCM received $15 million in financing to help further develop and extend the company's cloud enterprise content management platform and solutions. This round of financing included existing investors Foundation Capital and North Bridge Venture Partners, and Silicon Valley Bank joined to provide growth capital and working capital financing.

In April 2012, SpringCM announced SpringCM Mobile for iPad, iPhone and Android, allowing business people to securely share content and work together anytime, anywhere, from virtually any mobile device.

In September 2013, SpringCM, a Silver level member of Oracle PartnerNetwork (OPN), announced the availability of its Content Cloud Services solution in the new Oracle Cloud Marketplace.

In November 2013, SpringCM announced enhancements to the SpringCM platform that make it easier than ever for enterprises to share SpringCM content with people who do not use SpringCM.

In April 2014, SpringCM announced that it has received $18 million in funding from existing investors including Foundation Capital as well as new financial partners including Square 1 Bank and Fort Worth, Texas–based Goff Capital.

In October 2014, SpringCM was named as a leader in the Aragon Research Globe for Mobile Content Management.

In February 2016, SpringCM was named a Platinum Cloud Alliance Partner by Salesforce.

In March 2016, SpringCM announced the opening of its new office in San Francisco, California, in order to meet the demands of the rapidly growing business and its goal to grow globally. This move allowed the company to be closer to its partners and customers, including the headquarters of Salesforce and DocuSign.

In May 2016, SpringCM announced the opening of the company's offices in London to meet the demands of its growing business in Europe, the Middle East, and Africa (EMEA). SpringCM also announced the appointment of Lawrence Buckler as Area Vice President, EMEA, to head the new London office.

In June 2016, SpringCM announced that it has raised $17.5 million to accelerate its product development.

In October 2016, SpringCM announced a cloud document management solution for Salesforce customers designed to manage files across teams and organizations. The platform, G|1 Docs, combines a centralized, searchable repository with document and content management functionality, according to company officials.

In February 2017, SpringCM announced that it has generated $25 million in funding. Investors include Crestline Investors, Inc., a credit and structured capital focused institutional investment firm, and Foundation Capital. In conjunction with the funding, the company also announced a new CEO, veteran software executive Dan Dal Degan.

In April 2017, SpringCM announced it now integrates with the Salesforce Government Cloud, empowering government agencies to connect with their customers, partners and employees in entirely new ways.

== Specialties ==
Contract Management, Cloud, Automated Workflow, Contract lifecycle management, SaaS solution, Content Management, Document Management for Salesforce, Mobile Content, Contracts in Salesforce, Document Management, Business Processes, and Enterprise Content Management.

== Customers ==
SpringCM has over 600 enterprise customers, including Spotify, CASE Construction, Frontier Communications, ING, the USDA, NBCUniversal and more.
