= Juru =

Juru may refer to:

- Juru, Iran, a village in Iran
- Juru, Malaysia, settlement in Malaysia
- Juru, Paraíba, a municipality in Brazil
- Juru people, an ethnic group of Australia
- Juru language, an Australian language

== See also ==
- Cao Juru, Chinese politician
- Jooro, Queensland
- Juro (disambiguation)
