= Sirion (software) =

Software platform

Sirion is an artificial intelligence based contract lifecycle management (CLM) software platform used by enterprises to create, manage, and analyze commercial contracts. The platform integrates artificial intelligence, automation, and analytics to support the drafting, negotiation, execution, and monitoring of contracts among different organizations. It supports the management of millions of contracts across more than 100 languages.

== History ==
Sirion (formerly SirionLabs) was founded in 2012 by Ajay Agrawal, Claude Marais, Kanti Prabha, and Aditya Gupta. The company raised its initial venture funding in 2014. In May 2022, the company raised $85 million in a Series D funding round led by Partners Group, with participation from existing investors Sequoia Capital India (now Peak XV Partners) and Tiger Global Management. Over time, it evolved into an AI-native contract lifecycle management platform designed for creation and management of the complete lifecycle of enterprise contracts. By the mid-2020s, the platform was used to manage millions of contracts across several countries. In January 2026, Haveli Investments, a technology-focused investment firm based in Austin, Texas, announced a majority investment in the company. The transaction was completed in February 2026. The company is headquartered in Lehi, Utah, and has 10 offices in several countries.

== Technology ==
Sirion provides a cloud-based platform for contract management. The platform also supports natural-language interaction with contracts and analysis across contract portfolios.
