= CFCM =

CFCM may refer to:

- CFCM-TV, a television station (channel 4) licensed to Quebec City, Quebec, Canada
- French Council of the Muslim Faith
- Canadian Fellowship of Churches and Ministries
- Certified Federal Contracts Manager (See National Contract Management Association)
