= NAGC =

NAGC may refer to:

- National Association for Gifted Children, or Potential Plus UK, a British charity
- National Association of Government Contractors, an American trade association
