= Garrison W. Wynn =

American motivational speaker (born 1961)

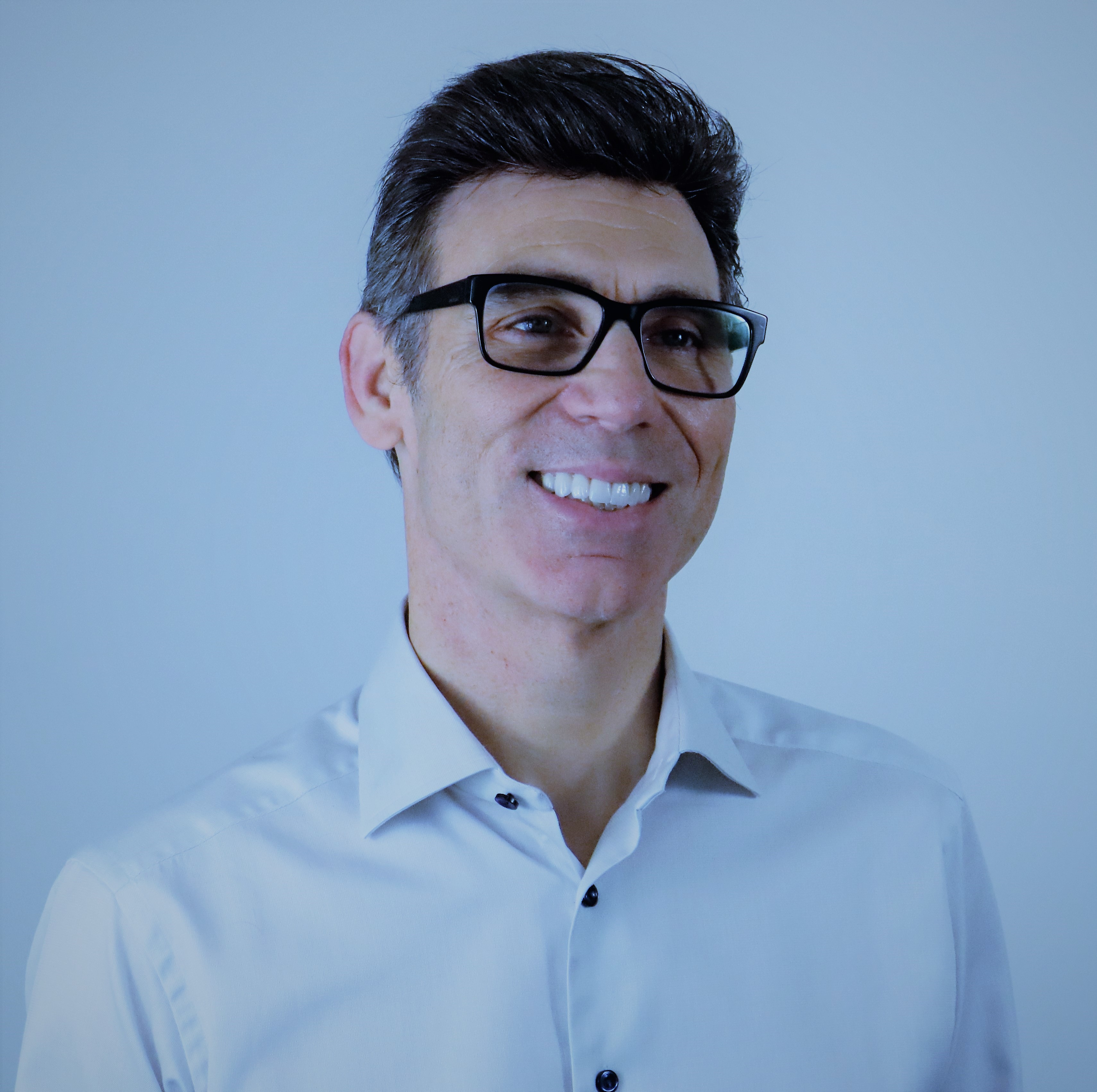
- Wynn in 2019
- Born: July 18, 1961 (age 65)
- Occupations: Author; Consultant; Motivational Speaker
- Website: https://www.motivational-speaker-success.com/

Garrison W. Wynn is an author, consultant, and motivational speaker. He is the author of the book The Real Truth About Success: What the Top 1% Do Differently, Why They Won't Tell You, and How You Can Do It Anyway! published by McGraw-Hill Education.

== Career ==
Wynn has been a keynote speaker for companies and organizations such as Indiana University, SciQuest, the Southeast Mine Safety & Health Conference, TechFest 2015, Professional Dairy Producers of Wisconsin, Automotive Aftermarket Products Expo, the Midwest Multifamily Conference, the National Business Aviation Association, the MAPP Conference and many others. He speaks 90 or more times per year.

Wynn is listed by many speaker bureaus including American Program Bureau, Executive Speakers, Speak Inc, Robinson Speakers Bureau, Midwest Speaker's Bureau, Goodman Speakers Bureau, Premiere Speakers Bureau, Keppler Speakers and the Texas Speakers Bureau.

Wynn was International Corporate Fulfillment Manager for SCI from 1984 to 1990. He was a Sales Engineer with Babbitt International from 1990 to 1993.

== Publications ==
Wynn wrote a biweekly column for the Washington Post from Nov 2009 – Dec 2010 called On Success.

He has appeared in Forbes, on ZDNET, Selling Power Magazine, The Houston Business Journal and Plastics Business Magazine.

== Bibliography ==
- The Real Truth About Success: What the Top 1% Do Differently, Why They Won't Tell You, and How You Can Do It Anyway! (2007) (ISBN 978-0071629966)
- Top Dog Sales Secrets: 50 Top Experts Show You Proven Ways to Skyrocket Your Sales (2007) (ISBN 1934346144)
- The Cowbell Principle: Career Advice On How To Get Your Dream Job And Make More Money (2014)
