= B+H Ocean Carriers =

International shipping company

B+H Ocean Carriers Ltd.
- Industry: Shipping
- Founded: 1978
- Headquarters: Hamilton, Bermuda
- Area served: Global
- Website: www.bhocean.com

B+H Ocean Carriers Ltd. is an international shipping company. The company operates seven bulk ships, seven product tankers and two chemical tankers. Based in Hamilton, Bermuda the company also has offices in Oslo, Singapore, Bristol and New York. The company is listed on the Oslo Stock Exchange and the American Stock Exchange.

== History ==
The company started out in 1978 when, B+H Shipping Group was founded by Arvid Burgvall and Michael Hudner in New York City and Oslo. In 1984 it also started with commercial management of its ships.

B+H Ocean Carriers was founded in 1988 when B+H took over Canadian Pacific's fleet of handysize and medium range tankers. At the same time the company was listed in the American Stock Exchange.

In 1989 the company bought the Marathon Oil Company's fleet of panamax and suezmax tankers.

1991 saw the introduction of technical management in the company. The company entered the bulk sector in 2004.

In 2012, the company filed for Chapter 11 bankruptcy protection.
