= ModelSheet =

US software company

ModelSheet Software LLC
- Type: Private
- Industry: Business intelligence, business analytics
- Founded: 2007
- Headquarters: Arlington, Massachusetts
- Key people: Richard Petti, Howard Cannon
- Website: http://www.modelsheetsoft.com/

ModelSheet Software LLC is a venture-funded software company focused on business analytics and based in Arlington, Massachusetts.

== History ==
ModelSheet was founded by two MIT graduates, Richard Petti and Howard Cannon, who earlier worked together at Symbolics and later in the division spun out as Macsyma. After the Macsyma episode in the 1980s and the 1990s, the pair took separate career paths, with Petti at The MathWorks, and Cannon at Groton NeoChem and SciQuest, and then merged their companies to found ModelSheet in 2007.

== Strategy, products and services ==
ModelSheet Software was founded to put more desktop modeling power in the hands of business experts without requiring them to become programmers. The spreadsheet is the classic example of such an end-user development tool, but its cell-based paradigm has its limitations. ModelSheet technology attempts to addresses these limitations with two types of products: Custom Spreadsheet Solutions, and the ModelSheet Authoring Environment.

By filling in a simple form, a Custom Spreadsheet Solution yields a custom spreadsheet workbook, without users having to edit spreadsheets or cell formulas. Users can set three aspects of spreadsheet models: time series (time range, time grains, and rollup grains), dimensions (e.g. a list of products organized in product families) and turning on or off model features.

ModelSheet offers Custom Spreadsheet Solutions for many common business tasks in corporate finance (financial plans, cash flow analysis, cap tables, activity-based budgets, etc.), marketing and sales analysis (sales plans, marketing program effectiveness, price elasticity, etc.) and other areas. Users can download the Custom Spreadsheet Solutions as Excel workbooks, or upload them to an account on Google Docs.

The ModelSheet Authoring Environment has all the functionality needed to build spreadsheet models from scratch and edit existing models. It retains the graphical representation of spreadsheets, while adding in model structures such as named variables, symbolic formulas with varying scopes, time series, dimensions, and controls for optional features and automated operations. ModelSheet Authoring is the technical backend of Custom Spreadsheets. For intermediate applications (where more flexibility is needed, but the customer doesn't require frequent use of the Authoring Environment itself) ModelSheet offers consulting services in which a ModelSheet engineer uses the Authoring Environment to create a spreadsheet to the customer's specification.

== Criticism ==
Testing a pre-beta version in 2008, journalist Dennis Howlett of ZDNet concluded that ModelSheet was "good in theory" but "needs more work." Howlett criticised several aspects: Windows-only platform support, bugs, poor usability, choice of fonts, and dull quick start guide. Although "bemused" by the product, Howlett did concede, "ModelSheet is at an early stage of development, and I'm sure [it] will improve over time."

== See also ==
- Macsyma (for information on founders' earlier work together there)
- Microsoft Excel
- Spreadsheet
- End-user development
- Business Analytics
- Business Intelligence
  - Business Intelligence 2.0
