= SSRM =

SSRM may stand for:

- Scanning spreading resistance microscopy, a scanning probe microscopy technique that involves the use of an atomic force microscope
- Shared security responsibility model (or "Shared responsibility model"), a loose framework for delineating client and provider responsibility for security in the cloud
- Soviet Socialist Republic of Moldova, a former name of the Moldavian Soviet Socialist Republic
- Strategic supplier relationship management, a form of supplier relationship management with extra emphasis on collaborative approaches to create additional value in the partnership
