= SPM =

SPM may refer to:

== Places ==
- Saint Pierre and Miquelon (ISO 3166-1 code), an overseas French territory
- Salón de la Plástica Mexicana, an art museum in Mexico City
- Salsali Private Museum, Dubai, UAE
- Shyama Prasad Mukherji College, University of Delhi, India
- St Philip's Marsh depot, Bristol, UK, rail depot code

== Organizations ==
- Socialist Party of Canada (Manitoba)
- Socialist Party of Macedonia
- Somali Patriotic Movement
- Sociedade Portuguesa de Matemática, the Portuguese Mathematical Society
- Porzellanfabrik Siegmund Paul Meyer, a former German porcelain manufacturer between 1899 and 2019

== Science and computing ==
- Scanning probe microscopy
- Scratchpad memory, in computing
- Self-phase modulation, nonlinear light–matter interaction
- Specialized proresolving mediators, cell signaling molecules
- Standard Progressive Matrices (IQ test)
- Suspended particulate matter

=== Software ===
- Statistical parametric mapping of brain activity

== Business and industry ==
- Supplier performance management
- Single-point mooring, for tankers
- S.P.M. Publications, later Key Publications, was an American comic-book company founded by Stanley P. Morse

== People ==
- South Park Mexican, aka SPM, American rapper
- S. P. Muthuraman, Indian film director
- Sean Patrick Maloney, American politician.

== Other ==
- Akukem language (ISO 639:spm), a Ramu language of Papua New Guinea
- IPCC Summary for Policymakers
- Sijil Pelajaran Malaysia (Malaysian Certificate of Education), a standardized test for secondary students in Malaysia
- Super Paper Mario, a video game for the Wii
- Spangdahlem Air Base, is a NATO air base and located near the small German town of Spangdahlem
