= National Grants Management Association =

Organization

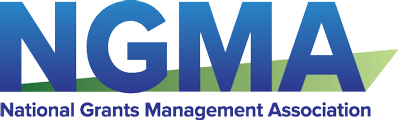
- Abbreviation: NGMA
- Formation: 1978; 48 years ago
- Type: Non-profit
- Purpose: Grant management services and training
- Location: Sterling, VA, United States
- Region served: United States
- Members: 5,000+
- Executive Director: Tip Tucker Kendall, CAE
- Website: ngma.org

The National Grants Management Association (NGMA) is an American professional association dedicated to grants management and training. Founded in 1978, NGMA has over 5,000 members with chapters throughout the United States and Puerto Rico. The association provides grants management training and professional certification. The NGMA is not a grant-making organization and does not award grants.

== Certification Program ==
The NGMA provides the Certified Grants Management Specialist (CGMS) certification program that requires candidates to fulfill specific educational and experiential prerequisites. The certification exam assesses the candidate's knowledge of grants management across a vast range of topics.

== See also ==
- Federal grants in the United States
- Contract
- Contract management
- Government procurement in the United States
- United States contract law
- National Contract Management Association (NCMA)
