= Fedict =

The FPS Information and Communication Technology (Dutch: FOD Informatie- en Communicatietechnologie, French: SPF Technologie de l'Information et de la Communication, German: FÖD Informations und Kommunikationstechnologie) or Fedict is a Federal Public Service of Belgium. Fedict works for the Belgian Federal Government and is responsible for e-government, in other words, electronic government. As such, Fedict helps the federal public departments (FPDs) to improve their communication and services to the general public, businesses and civil servants, using information and communication technology. Fedict works with the FPDs, continuously developing new electronic services available via the federal portal.

Fedict has also helped to produce the electronic identity card (eID) and the Tax-on-web system. Fedict also sets up campaigns, such as “Start2surf”, intended to promote computer and Internet use. The number of people able to use e-government services has been increasing as a result. Finally, Fedict is helping to make Belgium an important centre of IT knowledge. The department supports Belgian companies in exporting their know-how and experience in Belgian e-government projects abroad. Fedict works with OneSpan to provide authentication services for online government services.
