= Commercial management =

Planning, organizing, directing, and implementing an organization's commercial activities

Commercial management, also known as commercial administration, is the oversight, direction, and development of activities and interests that aim to facilitate and enhance value creation through commercial interactions. Its primary emphasis lies in the identification and pursuit of opportunities for market engagement and the generation of revenue through the effective management of associated transactions and relationships, and mitigation of related risks. It further entails controlling costs effectively to ensure profitability and sustainable growth. In other words, commercial management is concerned with the identification and development of opportunities for generating revenue streams, coupled with the management of the commercial aspects of operations, projects, and contractual obligations.

== Overview ==
Commerce refers to the activities involved in the exchange or transmission of goods, services, or value between an entity (an individual or a firm) and its customers, suppliers, or partners, generally with the aim of generating income and profit. In commercial dealings, products and other assets are exchanged or traded between parties in return for another form of economic value—typically money. Accordingly, organizational functions associated with purchasing, selling, supplying, exchanging, or generating revenue are considered commercial activities. These activities necessitate effective management to ensure optimal performance and sustainability.

Commercial management involves optimizing an organization’s resources, investments, and market opportunities while minimizing risks and costs. It focuses on developing and maintaining efficient commercial processes to ensure maximum profitability, quality, and service, aligning organizational goals with daily operations for long-term sustainability. Thus, commercial management plays a significant role in shaping the business landscape of an organization, using mutual cooperation to drive growth and innovation in an increasingly competitive market.The Chief Commercial Officer (CCO) is the highest official responsible for monitoring and directing the activities and growth of the organization in key areas of commercial management such as marketing, sales, supply chain and logistics, finance, product development and customer relations.

Although commercial management and business management exhibit considerable similarities, commercial management adopts a more specialized approach, focusing more on directing an organization’s commercial operations; whereas business management encompasses the broader oversight of a company’s overall functions.

== Roles ==
The scope of a commercial manager's role is multifaceted, contingent upon the scale, structure, and operational context of an organization. Core responsibilities of commercial management include identifying market opportunities, managing commercial dealings and contracts, tracking and analysing performance, managing risks and controlling finances, and maintaining strong relationships with stakeholders. To fulfill these functions, commercial managers are often required to coordinate and integrate a variety of tasks, including sales, marketing, strategy development, deal-making, budgeting, cost control, and stakeholder engagement. Those who work in the commercial departments of large multinational organizations may have specialized responsibilities in sales, marketing, contracting and negotiation, finance or supply chain management. In smaller businesses, commercial managers will be expected to handle all of these roles themselves, rather than overseeing a department containing a team of experts in each area. Regarding project-driven industries, commercial managers are typically responsible for various project-related commercial matters, often with a particular focus on procurement, resource management, financial management, negotiations and contracts, and legal compliance.

Commercial management within an organization is also applied at policy levels. Commercial policies define the rules and practices governing how business is carried out and the standard terms under which external relationships are conducted. Many of these policies are reflected in the terms of any contract in which the organization engages. At a transactional level, commercial management is applied through the oversight of trading relationships to ensure their compliance with business goals or policies and to understand or manage the financial and risk implications of any variations.

=== In public sector ===
Commercial managers in the public sector are primarily responsible for managing contracts and procurement, optimizing the use of resources, maintaining supplier relationships, and overseeing the commercial aspects of the organization's projects.

Within the UK government, civil service competency includes the ability to "[achieve] commercial outcomes". An "uplift in commercial and contract management capabilities" among staff in government and the wider public sector engaged in project and programme delivery has been seen as an important efficiency goal. A "Contract Management Capability Programme" was initiated in 2018 to secure training, development and accreditation in contract management, including the commercial elements of delivering government programmes.

== Structure ==
Commercial management is the management of all processes related to purchasing and sales activities drawing upon the integrated application of knowledge from disciplines such as management, economics, finance, marketing and supply chain. Its primary objective is to create, ensure and sustain profitability and long-term commercial value. As such, the field encompasses a wide range of interconnected activities, including:

=== Sales ===
Sales constitutes a fundamental aspect of commerce, that directly contributes to generating income. The effective management of the entire sales process—encompassing forecasting, strategic planning, performance measurement, and the practical application of sales techniques—significantly enhances revenue outcomes.

=== Marketing ===
Marketing is a main component of commerce, considering that a marketplace is essentially an environment for trade among people—a center of commerce. Marketing focuses on the process of providing goods and services to consumers by identifying and responding to their needs and preferences. All marketing functions—such as identifying and developing new markets, analyzing market trends and competitors, assessing consumer demands, pricing, positioning, promotional activities, and creating customers loyalty; are essential drivers of commercial success.

=== Supply chain management ===
Supply chain management has a significant role in commerce by ensuring the right products and services are sourced at the best prices while maintaining quality and timely delivery. Without a well-managed supply chain, the process of trading products becomes sluggish, costly and unreiable. Its core lies in on managing the flow of goods and services from suppliers to end customers.

==== Procurement ====
Procurement is the process of acquiring goods and services from external sources, often through tendering or competitive bidding. It involves planning, selecting vendors, defining contract terms, purchasing the necessary items, and ensuring that the purchased goods or services meet the specified quality and delivery requirements.

==== Logistics ====
Logistics optimize the movement and storage of goods throughout the supply chain and it is responsible for ensuring that goods reach their destination correctly, on time, and at low cost. It includes processes such as transportation, warehousing, packaging, distribution and inventory management.

=== Economic analysis and evaluation ===
Economic analysis is an integral part of commercial management which facilitating informed decision-making, as it primarily involves the evaluation of costs and benefits, and better allocation of resources. It involves identifying, measuring, estimating, and evaluating the inputs and outputs of alternative activities or projects, followed by a comparative analysis to determine the most optimal option.

=== Finance ===
Monetary resources play a fundamental role in commerce, primarily serving as a medium of exchange, measure of value, and store of value. Likewise, the field of commercial management is closely intertwined with financial management, which concentrates on the optimal allocation and utilization of financial resources; especially in areas such as budgeting, cost management, cash flow management, profitability analysis, and banking.

=== Legal affairs and regulatory compliance ===
Commercial management relies on legal expertise (especially commercial law) to ensure that an organization's business operations are conducted in accordance with legal requirements and comply with government rules and regulations.

=== Commercial performance optimization and analysis ===
Effective decision-making, planning, and process optimization are essential for improving performance in commercial operations. Analytical methods, such as operations research and data analysis, play a key role in this process. Operations research applies mathematical and statistical methods to solve business challenges. In a similar vein, data analysis enables managers to understand market trends, customer behavior, and risks, further enhancing decision-making and operational efficiency.

=== Communication management ===
Commerce is inherently a social interaction. In commercial activities, effective communication management is essential for fostering relationships and resolving conflicts with all stakeholders, including customers, suppliers, creditors, contractors, team members and the public.

=== Contract negotiation and management ===
It is the process of managing deals and contract structuring—whether on the buy-side or sell-side, or in dealings with customers, suppliers, or partners—that supports commercial management by overseeing the stages of preparation, negotiation, execution, performance and monitoring of legally binding agreements and associated risks.

=== Business development ===
Business development is the processes of developing and implementing growth opportunities in enterprises. Commercial managers ensure that these new opportunities are pursued in a sustainable, efficient, and strategically coherent manner, through rigorous assessment of financial viability, legal frameworks, operational capacity, and marketing dynamics.

=== Commercialisation and product development ===
The process of introducing new products, services, or technologies, to the market, which involves transforming opportunities—such as innovations and ideas—into profitable outcomes. The process encompasses various stages, including research and development, pricing strategies, and market introduction.

=== Strategic management ===
Commercial management involves shaping and executing commercial strategy, which is a comprehensive plan that defines the objectives and actions to increase profitability, drive revenue, control costs, and align market demands with organization's capabilities. This includes setting organization's objectives, creating policies and plans, and effectively allocating resources to implement the strategy.

=== Risk Management ===
Unforeseen events such as economic crises, supply chain disruptions, market fluctuations, competition, fraud, legal issues, and technological obsolescence can each lead to reduced profits or major financial losses. Hence, it is imperative to identify, assess, and manage the risks and threats that could undermine the commercial stability.

=== International trade ===
International trade involves the exchange of goods and services across borders, driven by factors like supply and demand, economic integration, international factor movements, and policy variables such as tariffs and quotas. Its efficient management requires a comprehensive understanding of global factors like geopolitical risks, cultural differences, currency fluctuations, and supply chain disruptions, etc.

=== Project management ===
In project-based sectors such as construction, engineering, IT, energy, pharmaceuticals, etc., many organizations operate in a project-oriented framework. In these industries, commercial and project management are closely tied due to the complex commercial factors involved in each project.

=== E-Commerce and online markets ===
As another function, commercial administration is responsible for making strategic decisions and developing plans regarding an organization's operations in online markets. This is notably due to the fact that e-commerce is constantly expanding, transforming commerce around the world, and offering customers easier access to products and services, irrespective of time and location.

== Specialized academic degrees ==
There are academic programs throughout the world, spanning from bachelor's to doctoral levels, equip professionals with the expertise and specialized knowledge necessary for effectively conducting and managing commercial affairs:

- Professional Diploma in Commercial Management
- Bachelor of Commercial Management
- Bachelor of Commerce (B.Com.)
- Bachelor of Commerce - Management (B.Comm.)
- Master of Commercial Management
- Master of Commerce (M.Com.)
- Doctor of Commerce (DCom)

=== Career opportunities ===
Practitioners within this field perform a comprehensive spectrum of specialized functions encompassing all organizational levels across both private and public sectors. Some common job opportunities in commercial management include:

- Chief Commercial Officer
- Commercial Director
- Commercial Manager
- Commercial Analyst
- Commercial Executive
- International Trade (Import/Export) Specialist
- Contract Manager
- Sourcing and Procurement Manager
- Digital marketing Manager
- Strategic Planning Officer
- Partnership Manager
- Programme Management Officer
- Pricing Analyst
- Compliance and Risk Specialist
- Account Executive
- Customer experience manager

== See also ==
- Business management
- Marketing management
- Strategic management
- Contract management
- Government procurement#Government Commercial Function and Government Commercial Organisation within the UK government
- Master of Commerce
