= Docusign =

American software company

Docusign, Inc.

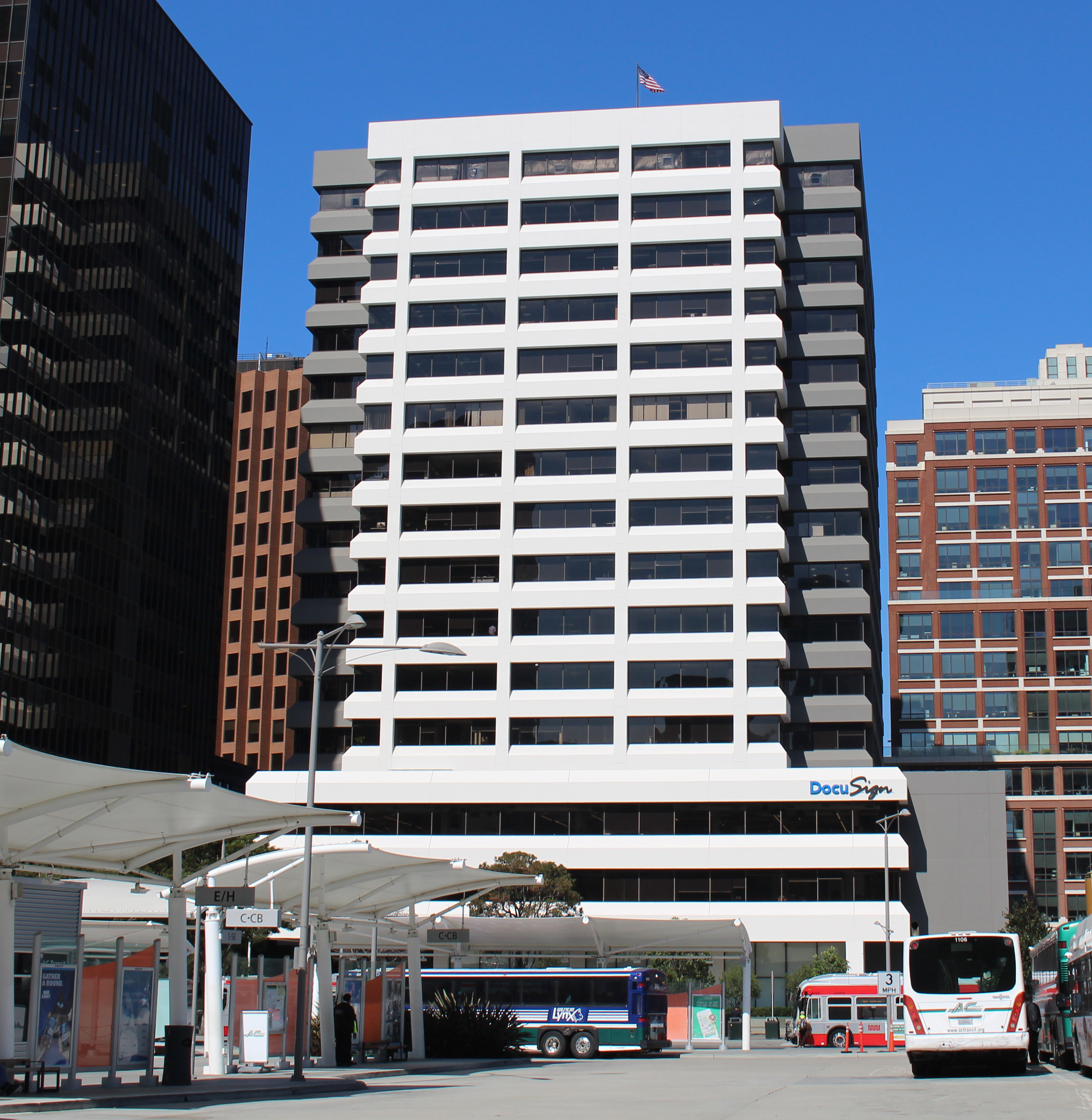
- Headquarters in San Francisco
- Type: Public
- Traded as: Nasdaq: DOCU; S&P 400 component
- Industry: Software
- Founded: 2003; 23 years ago
- Founders: Tom Gonser; Court Lorenzini; Eric Ranft
- Headquarters: San Francisco, California, U.S.
- Number of locations: 15 (2024)
- Key people: Maggie Wilderotter (chair); Allan Thygesen (CEO)
- Products: Electronic signature, contract lifecycle management and digital transaction management software and services
- Revenue: ▲US$2.98 billion (2025)
- Operating income: ▲US$200 million (2025)
- Net income: ▲US$1.07 billion (2025)
- Total assets: ▲US$4.01 billion (2025)
- Total equity: ▲US$2.00 billion (2025)
- Number of employees: 6,838 (2025)
- ASN: 62856
- Website: docusign.com
- Footnotes; Financials as of January 31, 2025.

Docusign, Inc. is an American software company headquartered in San Francisco, California that provides products for organizations to manage electronic agreements and contract lifecycle processes with electronic signatures and AI-supported data extraction on different devices.

In April 2018, Docusign filed for an initial public offering. At the time of the IPO, the largest shareholders were venture investment firms Sigma Partners, Ignition Partners, and Frazier Technology Ventures, and former CEO Keith Krach was the largest individual shareholder. None of the original founders are major shareholders. The company went public on the Nasdaq on April 27, 2018.

== History ==
Docusign was founded in 2003 by Court Lorenzini, Tom Gonser, and Eric Ranft. Tom Gonser came up with the idea when he was CEO of NetUpdate, a company he founded in 1998. Throughout its history, NetUpdate had acquired several companies, including an e-signature start-up in Seattle called DocuTouch, funded by Timberline Venture Partners, Bill Kallman, and Jeff Tung with $4 million. Timberline invested another $1 million in the merger into NetUpdate. DocuTouch held patents on Web-based digital signatures and collaboration. With internal support from Gonser, Lorenzini negotiated the purchase of certain DocuTouch assets from NetUpdate and started Docusign. Gonser then left the NetUpdate Board to focus on Docusign full-time.

The firm began sales in 2005 when zipForm, now zipLogix, integrated Docusign into its virtual real estate forms. According to Docusign, mock trials featuring licensed attorneys and judges highlighted the admissibility of Docusign contracts in court based on encrypted audit logs of signature events, and the impossibility of changing contracts.

In January 2007, Court Lorenzini stepped down as CEO and board chairman and was replaced as CEO by Matthew Schiltz, who served in that role until January 2010. Steven King replaced Schultz as CEO and moved the corporate headquarters from Seattle to San Francisco. Keith Krach became Docusign's board chairman in January 2010 and its CEO in August 2011.

Docusign began referring to its service as "eSignature Transaction Management". By the end of 2010, the company had handled 73 percent of the SaaS-based electronic signature market, with 80 million signatures processed. Scale Venture Partners led an investment round of $27 million in December 2010.

Docusign opened an office in London, England, in September 2011. In the same year, Docusign opened an office in San Francisco that now functions as its global headquarters.

Docusign signed an agreement with PayPal in April 2012 that allowed users to capture signatures and payments in a single transaction. Similar partnerships with Salesforce and Google Drive preceded the PayPal agreement.

On January 10, 2013, Docusign and Equifax announced a partnership to simplify electronic delivery of the Requests for Transcript of Tax Return Form 4506-T to the United States Internal Revenue Service. Under the partnership, Equifax allows lenders to use Docusign to securely send requests to loan applicants. Docusign and Equifax were among 14 firms that participated in a nine-month feasibility study of electronic signatures for 4506-T forms in 2011.

In October 2015, Keith Krach announced he would step down as CEO once a search for a new CEO was completed.

In January 2017, veteran software executive Daniel Springer was named the new CEO.

Docusign ranked number 6 on Fast Company's Most Innovative Enterprise Tech Companies of 2022, with an overall market share of 61%.

On June 21, 2022, Daniel Springer was replaced as CEO by Mary Agnes "Maggie" Wilderotter, and later Allan Thygesen as CEO on September 22, 2022. Thygesen assumed office on October 10.

In April 2024, the company announced a significant expansion of its company strategy, opening up a new SaaS category — Intelligent Agreement Management — and launching Docusign IAM, an Intelligent Agreement Management platform and new line-of-business-focused applications to lead that category.

=== Funding ===
In 2004, Docusign raised $4.6 million from Ignition Partners and Frazier Technology Ventures. In 2006, Sigma Partners became the largest shareholder, a position it held at the time of the IPO, with returns over $700 million. Between 2006 and 2009 Docusign raised $30 million that allowed the firm to add corporate clients and process 48 million signatures.

In July 2012, Docusign raised $47.5 million in venture funding from investors including Kleiner Perkins Caufield & Byers; the round later grew closer to $56 million. In March 2014, the company announced it had raised $85 million in a new funding round. Though unconfirmed, The Wall Street Journal reported the round was based on a company valuation of $1.6 billion.

In May 2015, the company announced it had raised $233 million in a new funding round, with some estimating a $3 billion company valuation.

In 2018, the company announced plans for an initial public offering on the Nasdaq. The IPO was completed on April 27, in which the company raised $543 million. Neither the original founders nor CEO Daniel Springer were major shareholders at that time. Former CEO Keith Krach was the largest individual shareholder at 5.5%, about 8.5 million shares at the time of the IPO. Venture capital firms Sigma Partners, Ignition Partners, and now-defunct company Frazier Technology Ventures were the largest non-individual shareholders.

== Acquisitions ==
In May 2013, Docusign acquired Cartavi, a Naperville-based startup that made real estate software. This was later converted into Docusign Rooms and the base API for Docusign Workspaces.

In July 2018, Docusign acquired SpringCM for $220 million.

In February 2020, Docusign acquired Seal Software for $188 million.

On June 1, 2021, Docusign acquired Clause, a legal contract technology startup.

In May 2024 the company acquired Lexion, an AI contract management company, for a reported $165 million.

== Products ==
Docusign's services are offered either by subscription or through a mobile app. Docusign released the mobile app in November 2011.

Docusign Professional emails recipients an electronically signed document requesting review of a document after it is uploaded. Each party must agree to complete business electronically, review the document, and apply a signature. Signatures may be added from a stored copy of a signature or generated automatically by the software. Phone confirmation and background checks are offered as premium services.

== Litigation ==
In a 2016 case, it was found that a lawyer in Sacramento who had exclusively been using Docusign signatures had the signatures rendered invalid due to the legal requirements of a physical signature known as a wet signature.

A class action began against Docusign in 2022 regarding their conduct from 2020 to 2021 that alleged the company misled investors and shareholders with false reporting. According to the initial complaint, Docusign "failed to disclose the role the COVID-19 pandemic had on its growth, including the positive impact on Docusign's business. [Docusign] also downplayed the impact that a 'return to normal' would have on the Company's growth and business."

In 2023, the company's former CEO Daniel Springer filed a lawsuit against Docusign. While the company claimed that Springer had resigned, his lawsuit alleged that the resignation was fabricated.

== Docusign IMPACT Foundation ==
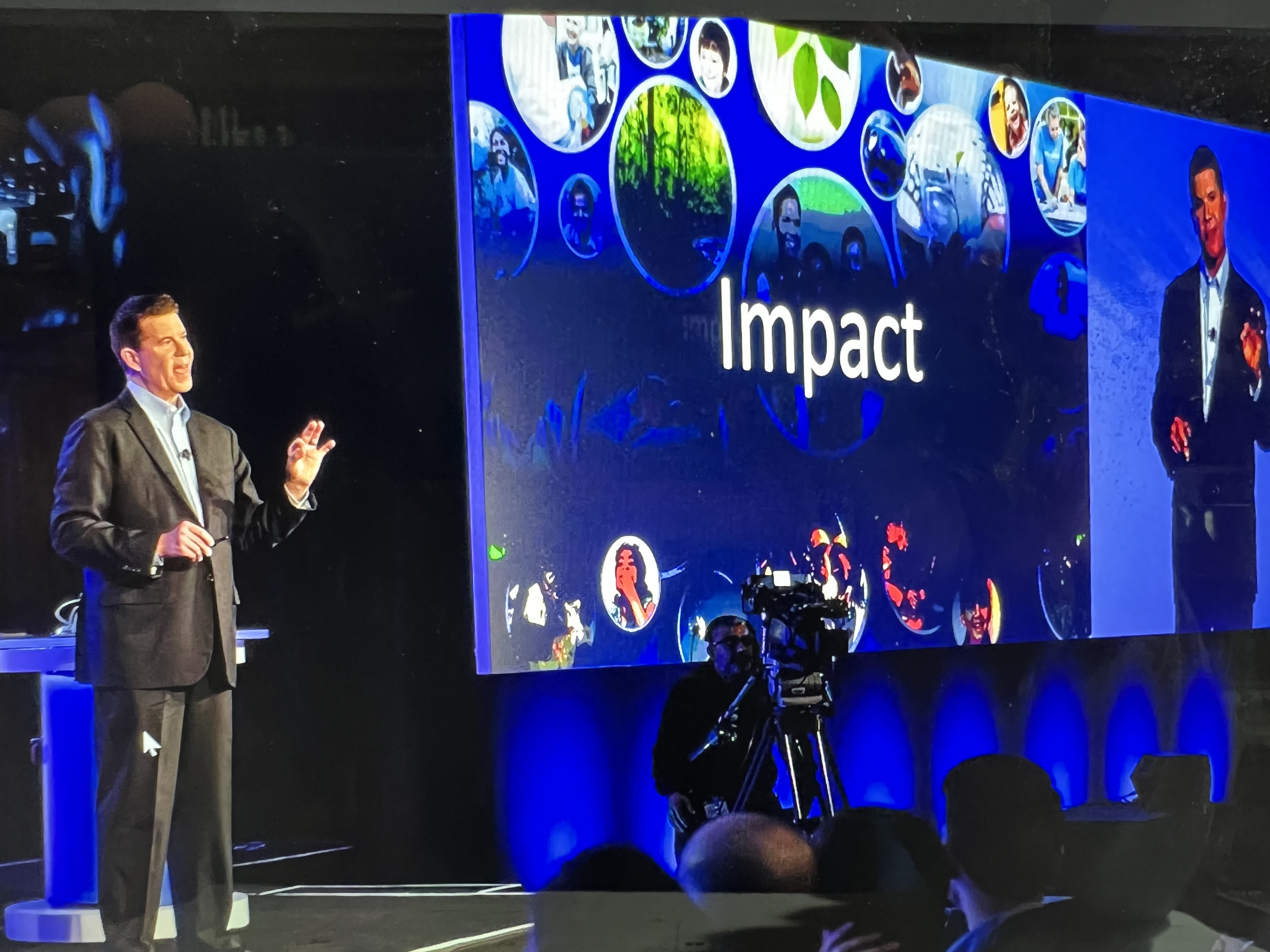
Krach announces the formation of the IMPACT Foundation at the Momentum user conference, 15 March 2015.

On 15 March 2015, CEO Keith Krach announced the formation of the $30 million Docusign IMPACT Foundation, a philanthropy department of the company to donate to charities.

== See also ==
- Adobe Sign
- Handwriting recognition
- HelloSign
- OneSpan
- PandaDoc
- Title 21 CFR Part 11
- Uniform Electronic Transactions Act
