= Supplier relationship management =

Concept in business strategy

Supplier relationship management (SRM) is the systematic, enterprise-wide assessment of suppliers' strengths, performance and capabilities with respect to overall business strategy, determination of what activities to engage in with different suppliers, and planning and execution of all interactions with suppliers, in a coordinated fashion across the relationship life cycle, to maximize the value realized through those interactions. The focus of supplier relationship management is the development of two-way, mutually beneficial relationships with strategic supply partners to deliver greater levels of innovation and competitive advantage than could be achieved by operating independently or through a traditional, transactional purchasing arrangement. Underpinning disciplines which support effective SRM include supplier information management, compliance, risk management and performance management.

The objective of SRM is to maximize the value of those interactions. In practice, SRM entails creating closer, more collaborative relationships with key suppliers in order to uncover and realize new value and reduce risk of failure. SRM is a critical discipline in procurement and supply chain management and is crucial for business success.

SRM is analogous to customer relationship management (CRM). Just as companies have multiple interactions over time with their customers, so too do they interact with suppliers – negotiating contracts, purchasing, managing logistics and delivery, collaborating on product design, etc. The starting point for defining SRM is a recognition that these various interactions with suppliers are not discrete and independent – instead they are accurately and usefully thought of as comprising a relationship, one which can and should be managed in a coordinated fashion across functional and business unit touch-points, and throughout the relationship life-cycle.

== Components of SRM ==
SRM necessitates a consistency of approach and a defined set of behaviors that foster trust over time. Effective SRM requires not only institutionalizing new ways of collaborating with key suppliers, but also actively dismantling existing policies and practices that can impede collaboration and limit the potential value that can be derived from key supplier relationships. At the same time, SRM should entail reciprocal changes in processes and policies at suppliers.

=== Organizational structure ===
While there is no one correct model for deploying SRM at an organizational level, there are sets of structural elements that are relevant in most contexts:

1. A formal SRM team or office at the corporate level. The purpose of such a group is to facilitate and coordinate SRM activities across functions and business units. SRM is inherently cross-functional, and requires a good combination of commercial, technical and interpersonal skills. These “softer” skills around communication, listening, influencing and managing change are critical to developing strong and trusting working relations.
2. A formal relationship manager or supplier account manager role. Such individuals often sit within the business unit that interacts most frequently with that supplier, or may be filled by a category manager in the procurement function. This role can be a full-time, dedicated positions, although relationship management responsibilities may be part of broader roles depending on the complexity and importance of the supplier relationship (see Supplier segmentation). Effective SRM managers understand their suppliers' business and strategic goals, and are able to see issues from the supplier's point of view while balancing their own organization's requirements and priorities.
3. An executive sponsor and, for complex, strategic supplier relationships, a cross-functional steering committee. These individuals form a clear link between SRM strategies and overall business strategies, serve to determine the relative prioritization among a company's varying goals as they impact suppliers, and act as a dispute resolution body.

=== Governance ===
The SRM office and supply chain function are typically responsible for defining the SRM governance model, which includes a clear and jointly agreed governance framework in place for some top-tier strategic suppliers. The ownership can as well be set in departments concerned with operational or strategic procurement or category management. Effective governance should comprise not only designation of senior executive sponsors at both customer and supplier and dedicated relationship managers, but also a face-off model connecting personnel in engineering, procurement, operations, quality and logistics with their supplier counterparts; a regular cadence of operational and strategic planning and review meetings; and well-defined escalation procedures to ensure speedy resolution of problems or conflicts at the appropriate organizational level.

Effective supplier relationship management requires an enterprise-wide analysis of what activities to engage in with each supplier. The common practice of implementing a “one size fits all” approach to managing suppliers can stretch resources and limit the potential value that can be derived from strategic supplier relationships. Supplier segmentation, in contrast, is about determining what kind of interactions to have with various suppliers, and how best to manage those interactions, not merely as a disconnected set of siloized transactions, but in a coordinated manner across the enterprise. Suppliers can be segmented, not just by spend, but by the total potential value (measured across multiple dimensions) that can be realized through interactions with them. Further, suppliers can be segmented by the degree of risk to which the realization of that value is subject.

=== Joint activities ===
Joint activities with suppliers might include:

- Supplier summits, which bring together a range of strategic suppliers together to share the company's strategy, provide feedback on its strategic supplier relationship management program, and solicit feedback and suggestions from key suppliers. For example, nearly 100 vendors from Indian firms of all sizes attended a BAE Systems supplier summit in New Delhi in 2019 organised to "support the development of [the company's] Indian suppliers". A "strategic supplier summit" held in February 2011 promoted the UK government's intention to introduce more openness in relation to "the contracts it signs, the goods and services it purchases and the way it purchases them".
- Executive-to-executive meetings
- Strategic business planning meetings, where relationship leaders and technical experts meet to discuss joint opportunities, potential roadblocks to collaboration, activities and resources required, and share strategies and relevant market trends. Joint business planning meetings are often accompanied by a clear process to capture supplier ideas and innovations, direct them to relevant stakeholders, and ensure that they are evaluated for commercial suitability, and developed and implemented if they are deemed commercially viable.
- Operational business reviews, where individuals responsible for day-to-day management of the relationship review progress on joint initiatives, operational performance, and risks.

=== Value measurement ===
SRM delivers a competitive advantage by harnessing talent and ideas from key supply partners and translates this into product and service offerings for end customers. One tool for monitoring performance and identifying areas for improvement is the joint, two-way performance scorecard. A balanced scorecard includes a mixture of quantitative and qualitative measures, including how key participants perceive the quality of the relationship. These KPIs are shared between customer and supplier and reviewed jointly, reflecting the fact that the relationship is two-way and collaborative, and that strong performance on both sides is required for it to be successful. Advanced organizations conduct 360 degree scorecards, where strategic suppliers are also surveyed for feedback on their performance, the results of which are built into the scorecard.

A practice of leading organizations is to track specific SRM savings generated at an individual supplier level, and also at an aggregated SRM program level, through existing procurement benefit measurement systems. Part of the challenge in measuring the financial impact of SRM is that there are many ways SRM can contribute to financial performance. These include cost savings (e.g., most favored customer pricing, joint efforts to improve design, manufacturing, and service delivery for greater efficiency); incremental revenue opportunities (e.g., gaining early or exclusive access to innovative supplier technology; joint efforts to develop innovative products, features, packaging, etc. avoiding stock-outs through joint demand forecasting); and improved management of risk.

=== Systematic collaboration ===
In practice, SRM expands the scope of interaction with key suppliers beyond traditional buy-sell transactions to encompass other joint activities which are predicated on a shift.

- More disciplined and systematic, and often expanded, information sharing
- Joint demand forecasting and process re-engineering (has unlocked savings of 10–30 percent for leading organizations).

=== Technology and systems ===
There are myriad technological solutions which are purported to enable SRM. These systems can be used to gather and track supplier performance data across sites, business units, and/or regions. The benefit is a more comprehensive and objective picture of supplier performance, which can be used to make better sourcing decisions, as well as identify and address systemic supplier performance problems. SRM software, while valuable, cannot be implemented in the absence of the other business structure and process changes that are recommended as part of implementing SRM as a strategy.

The main benefits are:

- Make Fact-Based decisions
- Reduced costs (long-term)
- Improvements based on specific objectives
- Instant feedback to identify areas of improvement
- Get a 360° picture of each supplier
- Long-Lasting relationship
- Improved coordination, consistency, and transparency
- Enhanced fairness and motivation
- Accessible measurements and increased visibility

The main drawbacks:

- Takes time and focus for implementation
- Requires changes in behavior and culture
- Requires investment
- Fundamental business structure

== Challenges ==
- Creating the business cases
- Executive sponsorship
- Calculating return on investment (ROI)
- Developing an SRM sales pitch
- Finding vendors who have SRM capabilities

== SRM and supplier performance management ==
Some confusion may exist over the difference between supplier performance management (SPM) and SRM. SPM is a subset of SRM. A simple way of expressing the difference between SPM and SRM is that the former is about ensuring the supplier delivers what has been promised in the contract, which suggests a narrow, one-way process. SRM, in contrast, is about collaboratively driving value for both parties, resulting in lower costs, reduced risk, greater efficiency, better quality, and access to innovation. This requires a focus on both negotiating the contract and managing the resulting relationship throughout implementation, as well as systematic joint value-discovery efforts.

== Implementation ==
Writer Lars Kuch Pedersen suggests that there are six key steps in implementing an SRM program. There is a similar five steps approach described by writer Philippe Coution:

1. Segmenting the supplier base
2. Setting the objectives for the SRM program
3. Measuring the supplier performance against the objectives
4. Make your supplier engagement and governance plan
5. Engaging the suppliers, being transparent and getting aligned
6. Collaboration and continuous improvement.
