= Contract management software =

Contract management software constitutes software and associated data management used to support contract management, contract lifecycle management, and contractor management on projects in the procurement of goods and services. It may be used together with project management software.

== History ==
Historically, contract management was seen as a "paper-intensive" process. Early steps from the early 2000's reported by the Aberdeen Group required extensive data conversion work to enable documents to be handled electronically.

With the adoption of the European Union's General Data Protection Regulation (GDPR) in 2016, companies needed to take additional steps in regards to contract management. Each data responsible entity was obliged to sign data processing agreements (DPAs) with the various vendors, who treat personal data on behalf of the data responsible. DPAs need to be regularly controlled, adjusted and renewed, which adds an extra agreement to such vendors or at least an extra DPA addendum to each agreement.

By 2018, Ardent Partner's research had found that software used for automating contract management activities was being more extensively used among major companies or businesses with "Best-in-Class" procurement teams. Contract management process automation was found to be closely linked with more effective internal business collaboration, standardization and risk management.

== Advantages and key functions ==
Using contract management software can have multiple benefits compared to manually managing paper contracts. This software can help keep track of multiple activities and can have features for automating administration, ensuring compliance, monitoring risk, running reports and triggering alerts. In addition to these types of features, contract management software systems provide a centralized repository for employees to quickly access all contracts worldwide in one place.

Contract management software is produced by many companies, working on a range of scales and offering varying degrees of customizability. Basic functions should include the ability to store contract documents, track changes to contract documents, search documents for a particular criterion, send key date alerts and to report required aspects of the contract. Other functions include managing a new contract request, capturing related data, following a document through a review and approval process, and collecting digital signatures.

Contract management software may also be an aid to project portfolio management and spend analysis, and may also monitor KPIs. Leading contract management software provides contract visibility, monitoring, and compliance to automate and streamline the contract lifecycle process.

Contract management software which uses artificial intelligence (AI) can identify contract types based on pattern recognition. AI contracting software trains its algorithms on a set of contract data to recognize patterns and extract variables such as clauses, dates, and parties. It also offers simple prediction capabilities, by sorting through a large volume of contracts and flagging individual contracts based on specified criteria. AI software can also read contracts in multiple formats and languages, extract contract data, and provide analytics. It can reduce the risk of human error in contract drafting and review.

A centralized repository provides a critical advantage allowing for all contract documents to be stored within one location. Having contracts stored in multiple locations can delay and interrupt the contracting process.

== Contract risk management software (CRMS) for capital projects ==
Very large enterprises, such as capital expenditure (capex) projects, involve multiple parties and high risk and uncertainty. They are unlike traditional operating contracts in that they are subject to shared deadlines in unique situations. As the complexity of these unique projects increases, the relationships between parties become more important. This requires contract management software, or contract risk management software (CRMS), to become more dynamic and responsive.

The terms of these capex contracts necessarily involve assumptions at the start of the process and are likely to change over the lifetime of the project lifecycle. For this reason, CRMS must be capable of recording one single instance of agreed changes to contract terms and incorporating these changes in an auditable and legally robust way. With multiple decision makers involved, CRMS should also make accountability more transparent and enable faster decisions about variation proposals.
