= OneSpan =

American cybersecurity technology company

OneSpan Inc.
- Formerly: Vasco Data Security International, Inc.
- Type: Public
- Traded as: Nasdaq: OSPN; Russell 2000 component
- Industry: Software; Computer security
- Founded: 1984; 42 years ago
- Founder: T. Kendall Hunt
- Headquarters: Boston, Massachusetts, U.S.
- Key people: T. Kendall Hunt (chairman); Victor Limongelli (CEO)
- Revenue: $243.2 million (2024)
- Operating income: $44.8 million (2024)
- Net income: $28.8 million (2024)
- Total assets: $338 million (2024)
- Number of employees: 613 (2016)
- Website: onespan.com

Logo of VASCO as of 2012

OneSpan Inc. (until 2018 Vasco Data Security International, Inc.) is an information security company based in Boston, Massachusetts. Services include an internet fraud prevention platform, multi-factor authentication tools and electronic signature software.

== History ==
In 1984, T. Kendall Hunt founded Vasco as a consulting and software services company for corporate and governmental agencies. In 1991, the company acquired a majority interest in ThumbScan, which claimed to have the first fingerprint reader device for a computer.

In 1993, the company was renamed Vasco Data Security International and expanded its offerings to include data security. Vasco Data Security International was incorporated in July 1997. A public offering in March 1998 made it the parent company of Vasco Corp., which was merged into it in October 1998.

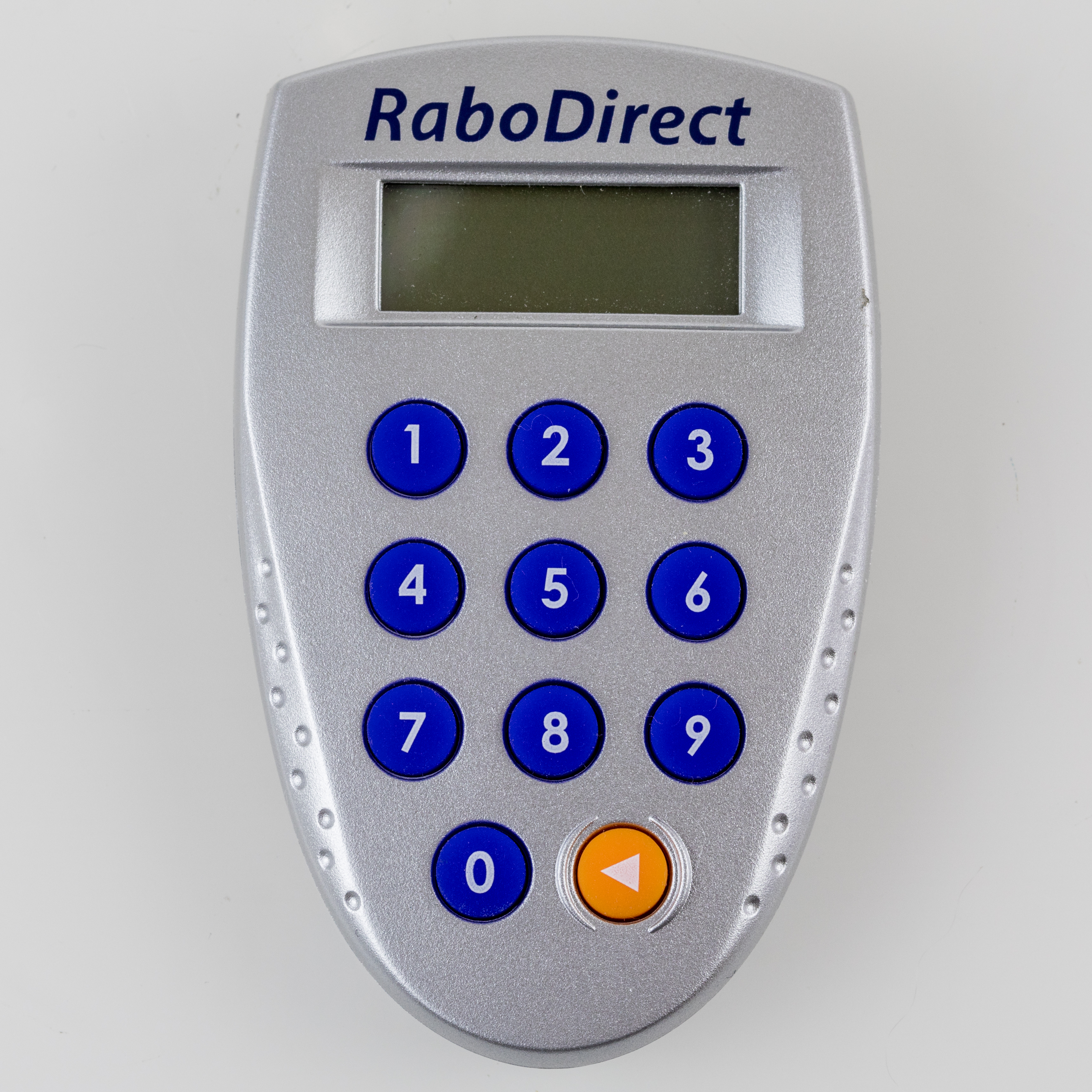
Vasco Digipass 250, branded RaboDirect

Vasco acquired the Digipass technology in July 1996, when it purchased the Brussels-based company Digipass NV/SA for $8.2 million. It had bought another Brussels firm, Lintel Security NV/SA, for $4.4 million a month earlier, and divested its original consulting business in August 1996. The company marketed the technology internationally in Belgium. In 2009, Vasco announced that Digipass two-factor authentication was available in the App Store for iPhone and iPod Touch. Forbes recognized Vasco on its list of "America's Fastest-Growing Tech Companies" that year.

In 2006, Vasco acquired LOGiCO Smart Card Solutions, a privately owned company located in Austria offering smart card–based authentication and PKI solutions.

In January 2011, Vasco acquired DigiNotar, a Dutch certificate authority. In June 2011, DigiNotar was hacked and started issuing false security certificates. When the news broke, all issued certificates were cancelled and the company went bankrupt.

In 2013, Vasco acquired Cambridge-based technology company Cronto. The patented CrontoSign solution uses specialized color bar codes, so-called Cronto Visual Cryptograms (or photoTAN), to mitigate MITB Trojan malware.

The company established its international headquarters at Dubai Silicon Oasis in 2012. Vasco announced that it would lower EMEA channel entry for VARs at that time.

In 2014, the company acquired Risk IDS, Ltd., a provider of risk-based authentication solutions to the global banking community. By 2015, IDENTIKEY Risk Manager (IRM) was released as a comprehensive risk management solution to improve the methods and speed of organizations to detect fraud.

In November 2015, Vasco completed its acquisition of Silanis Technology, a Canadian document e-signature company, for US$85 million (CA$113 million). By early 2016, the company's cloud electronic signature software, eSignLive, was updated to include integration with Salesforce. Vasco announced a face recognition authentication feature for Digipass in May 2016. The company has partnerships with financial institutions including HSBC Bank USA, Fedict, Rabobank, Arab Bank and Riyadh Bank. The Company has been appointed to the FIDO Alliance board directors.

On May 30, 2018, Vasco changed its name to OneSpan. It now trades under the ticker symbol OSPN.

In May 2018, the company acquired Dealflo, a UK and Canada-based financial agreement automation software company, for GB£41 million.

In January 2023, OneSpan announced it would acquire ProvenDB, an Australia-based startup that delivers secure storage and vaulting for documents based on blockchain technology.

In June 2025, OneSpan acquired Nok Nok Labs.

In February 2026, OneSpan completed the acquisition of Build38, a Munich-based mobile application security company spun off from Giesecke+Devrient, for $34.6 million.

== See also ==
- Docusign
- SignNow
