= Jaggaer =

American software company

JAGGAER
- Type: Private
- Industry: Internet Software & Services
- Founded: 1995; 31 years ago, in Durham, North Carolina, United States
- Headquarters: Durham, North Carolina, United States
- Area served: Worldwide
- Key people: Andrew Roszko (CEO)
- Products: Source-to-Pay, JAGGAER One, JAGGAER AI - JAI, Spend Management Software, Sourcing, Category Management, Contracts, Procurement Software, Supply Chain Collaboration, Invoicing, Payments
- Owner: Vista Equity Partners
- Website: jaggaer.com

JAGGAER, formerly SciQuest, is a cloud-based, AI-enabled procurement software and spend management company, covering sourcing, contract management, spend analysis, e-procurement, invoicing, payments, and supplier management. Headquartered in Durham, North Carolina, the company was founded in 1995 and took its current form after merging with the Austrian firm Pool4Tool and the Italian firm BravoSolution in 2017. Gartner has named JAGGAER a Visionary in its Magic Quadrant for Source-to-Pay Suites for 2024, 2025, and 2026, citing its AI-powered capabilities and depth in complex direct-materials procurement, and IDC MarketScape has separately named JAGGAER a Leader in evaluations of AI-enabled contract lifecycle management and direct-spend software.

As of 2026, JAGGAER is owned by the private equity firm Vista Equity Partners and led by chief executive Andrew Roszko, who succeeded Andy Hovancik in June 2025.

== Current positioning ==
As of 2026, JAGGAER describes its platform as built for complex, industry-specific procurement and spend-management workflows spanning sourcing, supply chain, and payments, with dedicated capabilities for sectors including higher education, discrete and process manufacturing, healthcare, and the public sector, and with AI embedded throughout via JAI. The company states that its platform serves more than 1,400 enterprise customers, connects a network of over 13 million suppliers, and manages an estimated $2.9 trillion in annual spend.

== History ==
=== Origins as SciQuest (1995–2016) ===
SciQuest was founded in 1995 as a business-to-business e-commerce exchange serving the higher-education and life-sciences sectors, going public in an initial public offering in 1999 and again, after being taken private in 2004, in a September 2010 IPO that raised approximately $57 million. The company then acquired AECsoft (supplier management and sourcing technology, January 2011), Upside Software (contract lifecycle management, August 2012), Spend Radar (spend analysis, October 2012), and CombineNet (advanced sourcing software, September 2013). In June 2016, SciQuest was taken private again in a $509 million acquisition by Accel-KKR.

=== Rebranding as JAGGAER and the Pool4Tool/BravoSolution mergers (2017) ===
In 2017, SciQuest rebranded as JAGGAER and expanded beyond higher education into manufacturing, healthcare, consumer packaged goods, retail, life sciences, logistics, and the public sector. That year the company combined with two established European vendors that, together with the SciQuest product line, form the core of today's JAGGAER One platform: Pool4Tool (Vienna, Austria) merged with JAGGAER in June 2017, adding direct-materials procurement alongside JAGGAER's existing indirect-procurement business; and BravoSolution (Milan, Italy) was acquired in December 2017, extending strategic-sourcing capability and JAGGAER's European footprint.

=== JAGGAER One and ownership changes (2019–present) ===
JAGGAER launched JAGGAER One, unifying its acquired product lines on a single platform, in February 2019. In July 2019, Cinven acquired a majority stake in the company at a reported valuation of approximately $1.5 billion, with Accel-KKR retaining a minority interest; Jim Bureau became CEO that October. Bureau departed in March 2023 and was succeeded by Andy Hovancik. Vista Equity Partners acquired JAGGAER from Cinven in August 2024, and Andrew Roszko, previously chief commercial officer at Descartes Systems Group, became CEO in June 2025.

== Products ==
JAGGAER's platform, marketed as JAGGAER One, is organized into several connected product categories:

Source-to-Contract

- Sourcing & sourcing optimization – Strategic sourcing events and algorithmic bid optimization for complex, multi-variable awards.
- Category management – Category-level spend planning and savings tracking.
- Spend analytics – Spend analysis across direct and indirect spend categories.
- Contract management – Contract lifecycle management, including AI-assisted contract review and obligation tracking.
- Rates management – Supplier pricing and logistics rate-card management.

Procure-to-Pay

- Procurement Software – Guided, catalog-based purchase requisitioning and purchase-order automation.
- Supply chain collaboration – Buyer–supplier collaboration on orders, quality management, and delivery schedules.
- Invoicing – Invoice capture and matching, including AI-driven "autonomous" accounts-payable processing developed with finance-automation partner AppZen — see Technology below.
- Payments – Supplier payment execution and payment-cost reduction tools within the procure-to-pay workflow.

Supplier Intelligence

- Supplier network & onboarding – A shared network for supplier registration and enablement.
- Performance monitoring – Supplier scorecarding and risk tracking.
- ESG data – Environmental, social, and corporate governance data collection from suppliers.

JAGGAER AI (JAI)

- JAGGAER's embedded artificial intelligence layer, spanning conversational assistance, guided buying, and increasingly autonomous ("agentic") handling of sourcing, spend-analysis, and invoice-approval workflows — see Technology below.

Catalyze (integration and platform services)

- Connect (JAGGAER Link) – API connections to enterprise resource planning systems.
- Security and compliance – Access controls, audit trails, and regulatory-compliance tooling.
- Embedded intelligence – The AI framework (Adopt, Advise, Assist, Analytics) underlying JAI across the other modules.

== Technology ==
JAGGAER has embedded generative artificial intelligence and agentic-AI features across its platform under the JAI (pronounced "Jay") brand, positioned by JAGGAER as an evolution of its earlier JAGGAER Assist tool. JAGGAER has described JAI's rollout in three stages: an initial conversational Assist mode answering procurement questions and guiding navigation; a Copilot stage adding contextual recommendations such as flagging pricing outliers; and an Autopilot stage intended to run defined workflows — such as invoice approvals or routine spend analysis — with reduced direct human input. JAGGAER introduced JAI at its REV2025 customer conference in Miami in June 2025 and made it generally available to customers in May 2026, reporting to trade press an expected 50% reduction in procurement support-ticket volume during customers' first year of use, adoption across more than 40 workflows, and support for 28 languages.

Alongside the JAI rollout, JAGGAER said it had achieved ISO/IEC 42001:2023 certification — an international standard specifying requirements for organizations to establish, implement, and continually improve an artificial-intelligence management system, covering governance and risk controls around how an organization develops and operates AI — which the company described as a first among source-to-pay software vendors.

In October 2024, JAGGAER announced a partnership with AppZen, an AI-focused finance-automation company, to integrate AppZen's "Autonomous AP" technology into JAGGAER's procure-to-pay platform. The integration is designed to perform AI-driven invoice data capture and automated general-ledger coding, match multi-line invoices to purchase orders without predefined rules, and process non-PO-backed invoices with reduced manual review, connecting to JAGGAER Invoicing through a standard REST API.

Independent trade coverage has identified JAGGAER among a small set of vendors leading the adoption of agentic AI and autonomous sourcing in procurement software, citing a 2026 Ardent Partners survey in which a majority of surveyed procurement leaders reported actively using or piloting AI.

== Recognition ==
Independent analyst firms have evaluated JAGGAER as follows:

Analyst firm	Evaluation	Years	Ref.
Gartner	Visionary, Magic Quadrant for Source-to-Pay Suites	2024–2026	
IDC MarketScape	Leader, AI-Enabled Buy-Side CLM within S2P Suites	2025	
IDC MarketScape	Leader, SaaS and Cloud-Enabled Direct Spend	2024	
Ardent Partners	Evaluated provider, AP Automation & Payments Technology Advisor	2026	

Gartner's report specifically credits JAGGAER's AI-powered source-to-pay solution and vertical-specific depth, particularly in complex direct-materials environments, as contributing to its Visionary placement. IDC has credited JAGGAER Contracts' scalability for large, compliance-driven organizations.

== Acquisitions ==
SciQuest acquired the following companies:

- AECsoft – January 2011. Provider of supplier management and sourcing technology.
- Upside Software, Inc. – August 2012. Provider of contract lifecycle management (CLM) solutions.
- Spend Radar, LLC – October 2012. Provider of spend analysis software.
- CombineNet – September 2013. Provider of advanced sourcing software.

JAGGAER acquired the following companies:

- POOL4TOOL – June 2017. Provider of direct sourcing and supply chain management software.
- BravoSolution – December 2017. Provider of global platform spend management solutions.
