= Category management (purchasing) =

Procurement strategy

Category management is an approach to the organisation of purchasing within a business organisation, also often referred to as procurement. Applying category management to purchasing activity benefits organisations by providing an approach to reduce the cost of buying goods and services, reduce risk in the supply chain, increase overall value from the supply base and gain access to more innovation from suppliers. It is a strategic approach which focuses on the vast majority of organisational spend. If applied effectively throughout an entire organisation, the results can be significantly greater than traditional transactional based purchasing negotiations, however the discipline of category management is sorely misunderstood.

The concept of category management in purchasing originated in the late 1980s. There is no single founder or originator, but the methodology first appeared in the automotive sector and has since been developed and adopted by organisations worldwide.

== Definitions ==
The Chartered Institute of Procurement & Supply (CIPS) defines category management as:

"Organizing the resources of the procurement team in such a way as to focus externally onto the supply markets of an organisation (as against having a focus on the internal customers or on internal ... departmental functions) in order to fully leverage purchasing decisions”.

Writing in 2007, CIPS argued in favour of a level of specialisation and precision which at the time it considered to be a "less fashionable" approach to the use of limited procurement resources, and similarly CIPS Australia notes from research undertaken in 2010 that "Category managers struggle to focus and specialise when their portfolio has too much breadth (they are managing multiple categories with few, if any, synergies) or too much depth (they are tasked with end-to-end procurement responsibility including strategic, tactical and operational requirements).

Jonathan O'Brien, author of Category Management in Purchasing, defines category management as:

"the practice of segmenting the main areas of organisational spend on bought-in goods and services into discrete groups of products and services according to the function of those goods or services and, most importantly, to mirror how individual marketplaces are organised. Using this segmentation organisations work cross functionally on individual categories, examining the entire category spend, how the organisation uses the products or services within the category, the marketplace and individual suppliers."

Mark Webb of Future Purchasing makes three statements in defining category management:

"It is a strategic end-to-end process for buying goods and services; it aligns business goals and customer requirements with supply market capability and it maximises long-term value for the organisation."

Peter Hunt, partner at ADR International, writes:

The term category management can mean different things to different people, so a working definition is needed. A 'category' is the logical grouping of similar expenditure items, such as spend on advertising agency services or IT hardware. Category management is the sourcing process used to manage these categories to satisfy business needs while maximising the value delivered from the supply base.

== Category management tasks ==
The main tasks of category management are:

=== Analysis ===
Data needs to be accessed from internal systems such as demand forecasts, the current spend and pricing and existing suppliers' capabilities and performance. This data typically comes from a company's ERP system, and often requires significant data cleansing. Internal data is then combined with external data, such as public information on suppliers, commodity prices, or currencies. Category analysis can be supplemented with commercial data sources such as supplier parentage, credit ratings, sustainability scores or supplier risk profiles. The ability to gain insights from specialist organisations with category expertise often makes outsourcing this activity attractive.

=== Development of strategy ===
A category strategy aligns needs to align with the business objectives and stakeholder needs. For example the Kraljic matrix can be used by category to segment the category by dividing placing it into one of four classes, based on the complexity (or risk) of the supply market (such as monopoly situations, barriers to entry, technological innovation) and the importance of the purchases or suppliers (determined by the impact that they have on the profitability of the company). This then allows the category manager to define the optimal purchasing strategies for the category.

Other analyses can be used such as Porter's five forces or SWOT Analysis.

=== Implementation ===
Once a strategy has been developed it must be implemented, and this often requires sourcing activity and contracting. In addition supplier relationship management systems need to be set up to facilitate subsequent monitoring. Implementation also includes change management: making sure that all the stakeholders understand the strategy and comply with it.

=== Monitoring ===
Monitoring the category performance and value delivery using key performance indicators (KPIs) and other feedback mechanisms.

== Skill requirements ==
CIPS Australasia argues that the skill set required for category management comprises strategic ability in relation to procurement and commercial competence, the ability to influence and communicate effectively, and a sub-set of skills which relate to the specific category being managed, which might include market knowledge, ability to set specifications for the goods and services being purchased within the category, and understanding of cost drivers and the wider environment in which the category operates. White has referred to the "awesome range" of skills required.

Kay Bayen of the European Institute of Purchasing Management (EIPM) has identified category management as a skill deficit area, with more procurement professionals being required to step into the role.

== Usage ==
=== Private sector ===
Today, category management is considered by many global companies as an essential strategic purchasing approach. Category management has been defined as “an evolving methodology that drives sourcing strategy in progressive organisations today”. However, not every business finds category management an effective business tool. The UK-based logistics company Whistl Group adopted category management but later found that it did not offer the flexibility which the company considered important.

=== Public sector ===
Many public sector organisations have adopted category management as a strategic transformation tool. Sir Philip Green, in his "Efficiency Review" of UK government spending (2010), recommended that "centralised procurement [should be] mandated for common categories to leverage ... buying power and achieve best practice". The implementation of category management within the UK was led by the Government Procurement Service (now Crown Commercial Service) with specialist input on certain categories: for example, its adoption for the categories of scientific and technical research, market research, social and economic research and the construction sector was led by UK Shared Business Services, a partner agency of the former Department for Business, Innovation and Skills.

In the United States, the federal General Services Administration, working with the Office of Management and Budget's Office of Federal Procurement Policy (OFPP), adopted category management as an operational tool for purchasing under the leadership of Thomas Sharpe, Commissioner at the GSA's Federal Acquisition Service, in April 2014. The GSA's model adopted a concept called "Category Hallways", part of a virtual route through which a federal buyer could enter the GSA's digital gateway for procurement and "walk" through the hallway. Relevant advice and guidance is presented in the hallway to support the federal buyer through their needs assessment and sourcing decision-making within the relevant category. For example, the "Facilities and Construction" category hallway on the FAS' online acquisition gateway provides

"broad-ranging content and resources applicable to the acquisition of construction related services and materials, facilities related services and materials, and the purchase or lease of facilities. Examples of these resources include expert articles about the industry, introductions to innovative contracting solutions in those areas, category governance and planning materials, and access to specific acquisition communities with deep functional knowledge and best practices."
