= Juro (company) =

British legal technology company

Juro Online Limited
- Company type: Private limited company
- Industry: Legal technology
- Founded: July 14, 2015; 10 years ago
- Founders: Richard Mabey; Pavel Kovalevich
- Headquarters: London, United Kingdom
- Area served: Worldwide
- Key people: Richard Mabey (CEO)
- Products: Contract lifecycle management (CLM) software
- Website: juro.com

Juro is a British legal technology company that develops browser-based contract lifecycle management (CLM) software. The platform is used by corporate legal and business teams to draft, negotiate, and manage contracts. In 2024, the company was ranked among the fastest-growing private technology companies in the United Kingdom by The Sunday Times.

== History ==
The company's UK legal entity was incorporated in July 2015 under the name Termscloud Limited, before rebranding to Juro Online Limited in October 2015. It was co-founded by Richard Mabey, a former corporate lawyer at the Magic Circle firm Freshfields Bruckhaus Deringer, and Pavel Kovalevich, a former IT consultant. Following its launch, the company raised a $750,000 seed round in January 2017, followed by a $2 million funding round in April 2018 led by Point Nine Capital and Seedcamp.

In January 2020, Juro raised a $5 million Series A funding round led by Union Square Ventures. This was followed in January 2022 by a $23 million Series B round led by Eight Roads. This funding milestone was covered extensively by the financial press, bringing the company's total venture backing to approximately $31.5 million at the time.

== Operations ==
Juro is headquartered in London, with an engineering presence in Riga, Latvia, and a United States headquarters in Boston, Massachusetts, which opened in 2025 to service the North American market. By 2024, the company reported processing over 2.5 million contracts for approximately 6,000 customers globally, with an enterprise client base that includes Deliveroo, Trustpilot, Pfizer, and WeWork.

== Products and services ==
Juro provides a cloud-based contract lifecycle management platform. The Law Society of Ireland Gazette has described the software as an end-to-end workflow platform that utilises a design-first approach accessible to legal, sales, and HR users. Centred on a browser-native text editor, it is designed to automate the drafting, approval, and execution of legal documents, functioning as a modular data alternative to static word processing files and PDFs.

The platform includes workflow integrations with third-party business software such as Salesforce, Slack, and HubSpot, as well as generative AI features for extracting data from legacy contracts and screening documents against internal legal playbooks. In August 2025, Juro established a strategic partnership with the AI agent platform Wordsmith, utilising the Model Context Protocol (MCP) to enable automated contract review workflows. This was followed in October 2025 by the introduction of an MCP integration connecting contract repositories directly to ChatGPT, enabling users to query legal data through AI assistants.

== Reception and market impact ==
In 2024, Juro was named one of the 100 fastest-growing private technology companies in the UK by The Sunday Times, ranking 31st based on its annual sales growth. That same year, the company was selected for the Tech Nation Future Fifty cohort, a UK government-backed programme for late-stage technology businesses. In 2025, European technology investment bank GP Bullhound named Juro the "Software Company of the Year" at its Allstars Awards.

The company has also published industry research on the legal sector, such as a 2025 survey on the adoption of AI tools by in-house legal teams that was covered by City A.M.

== See also ==
- Contract lifecycle management
- Legal technology
