= National Contract Management Association =

- Abbreviation: NCMA
- Formation: 1959
- Type: Non-profit
- Purpose: Contract Management
- Headquarters: Ashburn, Virginia
- Location: United States
- Region served: United States
- Members: 20,000+
- Website: Official website

The National Contract Management Association (NCMA) is a professional association, based in the United States, dedicated to the profession of contract management. Founded in 1959, NCMA now has over 20,000 members and more than 100 local chapters. NCMA promotes contract management through various means, including education, networking, publications, legislative and regulatory alerts, professional certifications, a code of ethics, awards, job postings, salary surveys, and a leadership development program.

== Certification programs ==
NCMA offers the following professional certifications in contract management:

- Certified Professional Contracts Manager (CPCM) based on demonstrating certain education, training, and experience requirements and successfully passing a comprehensive exam on a broad body of knowledge (BOK) for contract management.
- Certified Federal Contracts Manager (CFCM), previously Certified Associate Contracts Manager (CACM), based on demonstrating certain education, training, and experience requirements and successfully passing a comprehensive exam on the Federal Acquisition Regulation (FAR).
- Certified Commercial Contracts Manager (CCCM) based on demonstrating certain education, training, and experience requirements and successfully passing a comprehensive exam on the Uniform Commercial Code (UCC).

== Publications ==
NCMA produces the following contract management publications:

- Contract Management
- Journal of Contract Management
- Contract Management News
- Annual Review of Government Contracting
- Annual Contract Management Salary Survey
- Contract Management Standard (CMS) (ANSI/NCMA ASD 1)
- Contract Management Body of Knowledge (CMBOK)
- Desktop Guide to Basic Contracting Terms

== See also ==
- Contract
- Contract management
- Government procurement in the United States
- Federal Acquisition Regulation (FAR)
- Acquisition Management System (AMS)
- Uniform Commercial Code (UCC)
- United States contract law
- National Grants Management Association (NGMA)
