= Kraljic matrix =

Method used in supply chain management

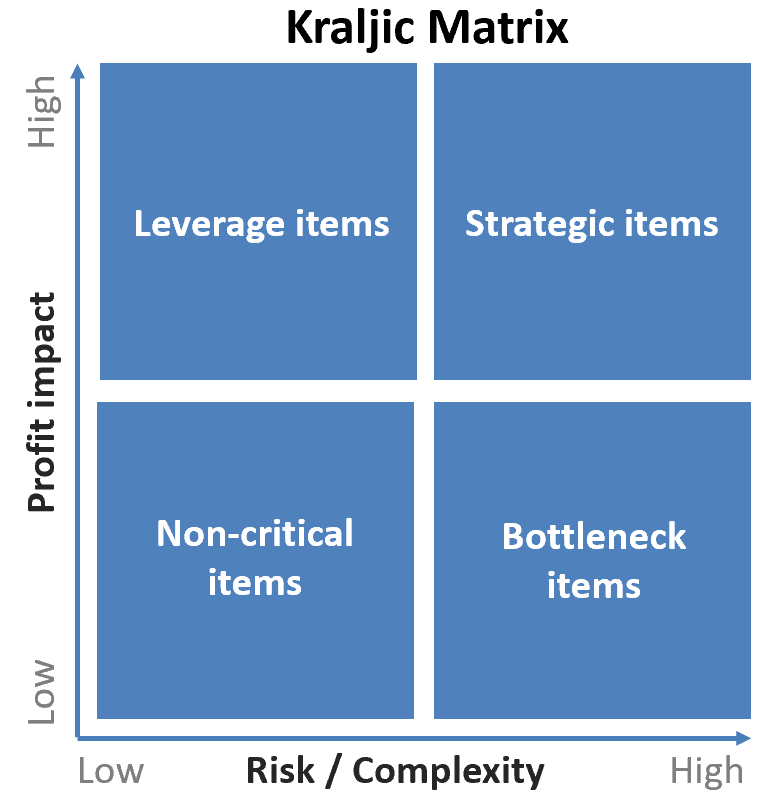
Illustration of the Kraljic matrix

In supply chain management, the Kraljic matrix (or Kraljic model) is a method used to segment the purchases or suppliers of a company by dividing them into four classes, based on the complexity (or risk) of the supply market (such as monopoly situations, barriers to entry, technological innovation) and the importance of the purchases or suppliers (determined by the impact that they have on the profitability of the company). This subdivision allows the company to define the optimal purchasing strategies for each of the four types of purchases or suppliers.

It is named after Peter Kraljic, who first formulated the model in an article called Purchasing Must Become Supply Management, published in the Harvard Business Review in 1983.

== Overview ==
The Kraljic matrix defines the following types of articles:

- Non-critical items: components that have a low impact on the company and that are found in abundance and / or in low-risk markets (e.g., office stationery). For such items, the goal should be to maximize efficiency of the procurement process to reduce the administrative burden, for example by delegating purchasing to local managers, or using catalogs.
- Leverage items: components that are important for the company but sourced from low-risk markets with an abundant supply. As the name suggests, the optimal management of these purchase categories is essential to ensure a satisfactory business result. For this type of component, the company tends to make the most of its bargaining power and the abundance of the offer with frequent negotiations.
- Bottleneck items: components with a low business impact in economic terms but where supply continuity is at risk. The management of these components should be aimed at creating relationships of collaboration in the medium-long term between customer and supplier to guarantee the supply, with less emphasis on the cost.
- Strategic items: components that are important for the company both in terms of economic impact and for supply conditions from complex and / or risky markets. In this field, the horizon is medium-long term with a continuous monitoring of the economic situation of the market, technical evolution, evaluation of "make-or-buy" options (the choice for a company between developing and manufacturing a product itself or outsourcing it from another supplier), creation of alternatives and development of stable relationships and maximum collaboration with the suppliers.

In its original form, Kraljic's matrix is used for the mapping of purchases, not suppliers.

== Misconceptions ==
In its original form, Kraljic’s matrix is used for the mapping of purchasing categories. However, the matrix is frequently misapplied to supplier segmentation rather than product or service segmentation, for which it was not designed. A single supplier may provide goods or services that span multiple quadrants of the matrix simultaneously, meaning any single classification of the supplier produces a misleading composite. This conflation of supplier with purchasing category can result in procurement strategies that are misaligned with actual supply risk and commercial opportunity.

A further limitation is that the matrix represents a static snapshot of supply market conditions at a point in time. Kraljic’s original intent was to inform periodic strategic planning, not to provide a continuous classification system. Supply risk, market complexity, and spend profiles change over time, meaning a classification that was accurate at the time of analysis may become unreliable as conditions evolve. Organisations that treat Kraljic classifications as durable rather than provisional risk making sourcing decisions based on outdated assessments.

A third common source of misapplication arises when practitioners substitute expenditure for profit impact as the vertical axis. Substituting spend introduces a systematic bias, elevating high-volume, low-margin categories while understating the importance of lower-spend items that are critical to product quality, operational continuity, or competitive differentiation. This distortion compounds the supplier-versus-category conflation, producing classifications that reflect purchasing volume rather than genuine strategic importance.
