= Contract management =

Concept in business systems

Contract management or contract administration is the management of contracts made with customers, clients, vendors, partners, or employees in both private and public sectors. Contract management includes negotiating the terms and conditions in contracts and ensuring compliance with the terms and conditions, as well as documenting and agreeing on any changes or amendments that may arise during its implementation or execution. It can be summarized as the process of systematically and efficiently managing contract creation, execution, and analysis for the purpose of maximizing financial and operational performance and minimizing risk.

Common commercial contracts include purchase orders, sales invoices, utility contracts, letters of engagement for the appointment of consultants and professionals, and construction contracts. Complex contracts are often necessary for construction projects, goods or services that are highly regulated, goods or services with detailed technical specifications, intellectual property (IP) agreements, outsourcing and international trade. Most larger contracts require the effective use of contract management software to aid administration among multiple parties. Contracts may provide for each party to nominate a person with a contract management role and/or detail the processes by which the contract is to be implemented, reviewed and amended.

A study published in 2007 found that for "42% of enterprises ... the top driver for improvements in the management of contracts [was] the pressure to better assess and mitigate risks" and additionally, "nearly 65% of enterprises report that contract lifecycle management (CLM) has improved exposure to financial and legal risk".

== Contracts ==
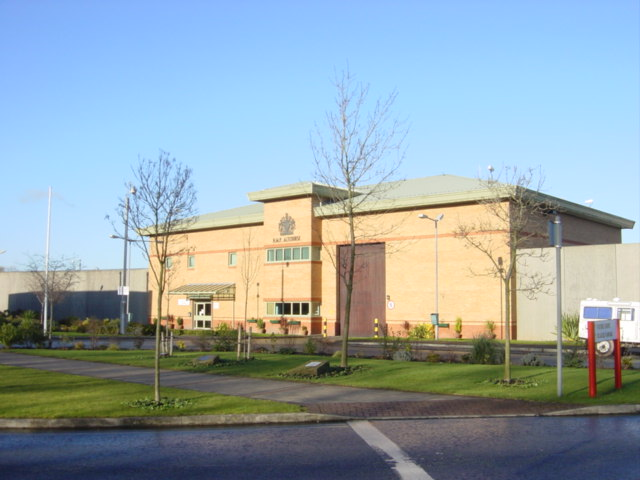
HM Prison Altcourse in Liverpool, operated by G4S under a UK government contract

A contract is a written or oral legally-binding agreement between the parties identified in the agreement to fulfill the terms and conditions outlined in the agreement. A prerequisite requirement for the enforcement of a contract, amongst other things, is the condition that the parties to the contract accept the terms of the claimed contract. Historically, this was most commonly achieved through signature or performance, but in many jurisdictions - especially with the advance of electronic commerce - the forms of acceptance have expanded to include various forms of electronic signature.

Contracts can be of many types, e.g. sales contracts (including leases), purchasing contracts, partnership agreements, trade agreements, and intellectual property agreements.

- A sales contract is a contract between a company (the seller) and a customer where the company agrees to sell products and/or services and the customer in return is obligated to pay for the product/services bought.
- A purchasing contract is a contract between a company (the buyer) and a supplier who is promising to sell products and/or services within agreed terms and conditions. The company (buyer) in return is obligated to acknowledge the goods / or service and pay for liability created. When the purchasing contract is between a retailer and manufacturer, the contract also includes conditions for processing returned items. However due to the cost of reverse logistics, retailers often dispose of returns rather than sending them the back to the vendor.
- A partnership agreement may be a contract which formally establishes the terms of a partnership between two legal entities such that they regard each other as 'partners' in a commercial arrangement. However, such expressions may also be merely a means to reflect the desire of the contracting parties to act 'as if' both are in a partnership with common goals. Therefore, it might not be the common law arrangement of a partnership which by definition creates fiduciary duties and which also has 'joint and several' liabilities.

== Contract management activities ==
Commercial contract management activity is directed towards ensuring that suppliers perform to their contractual obligations and that the client organisation secures the benefits intended by the contract. Compliance with legislative and other external requirements provides a distinct third purpose.

Contract management activities typically include:

- Authorizing and negotiation, although these roles may be distinguished in some cases, with authorisation being the role for a senior contract owner rather than a contract manager;
- Baseline management
- Commitment management
- Communication management
- Contract visibility and awareness
- Use of contract tools and commercial levers designed to secure the anticipated benefits of the contract, ensure that risk remains where it has been placed by the contract and discharge the incentives built into the contract to secure good performance and discourage poor performance. Contract tools include reporting and monitoring opportunities, change control mechanisms and exit planning;
- Document management
- Growth (for sales-side contracts)
- Contract compliance/governance

A business-standard contract management model is employed by many organizations in the United States.

=== Phases of contract management ===
Contract management can be divided into three phases:

- pre-contract phase
- contract execution phase
- post-award phase (often referred to as contract compliance/governance), including contract termination.

In the post-award or "downstream" phase, some organisations have a contract management team, others may require operational managers to include the management of contracts within their role. The Chartered Institute of Procurement & Supply (CIPS) suggests that the requirement for dedicated contract management depends on contract value, contract length, complexity of services and level of risk, although in the initial stages of a contract, the assessment of risk and the implementation of core contract management processes may be appropriate tasks for a dedicated contract manager. CIPS also notes that in some cases the procurement team may have an extended role in maintaining contract management. Contracting for services may be more complex than supply-only contracts and therefore require closer management. Standard forms of contract specify who should be appointed as a contract manager, for example under the ICE conditions of contract, term version,

the Employer has to appoint an engineer (who may be a person, firm or company) to design the Works Orders and supervise the carrying out of the Works as well as generally administering the contract.

=== Contract variation ===
There may be occasions during the post-award phase when what is agreed in a contract needs to be changed later on. A number of bases may be used to support a subsequent change, so that the whole contract remains enforceable under the new arrangement.

A change may be based on:

- A mutual agreement of both parties to vary the contract, outside the framework of the existing contract. This would be an independent basis for changing the contract.
- A unilateral decision to vary the contract, contemplated and allowed for by the existing contract. This would normally have notice periods for fairness and often the right of the other, especially in consumer contracts, to cease the contractual relationship. Any one-way imposition of change should be contractually justified, otherwise it may be interpreted as a repudiation of the original contract, enabling the other party to terminate the contract and seek damages.
- A bilateral decision to vary the contracting, within the variation or change control process outlined in the existing contract. These are often called change control provisions.

=== Contractual machinery ===
The term "contractual machinery" refers to the arrangements put in place to ensure that a contract can be effectively managed. An outline of how "contractual machinery" can break down was given by Humphrey Lloyd J in a UK legal case, Bernhard's Rugby Landscapes Ltd v. Stockley Park Consortium Ltd, in 1998:

A breakdown of the contractual machinery occurs when without material default or interference by a party to the contract, the machinery is not followed by the person appointed to administer and operate it and, as a result, its purpose is not achieved, and is either no longer capable of being achieved or is not likely to be achieved. It can for most practical purposes be equated to interference by a contracting party in the process whereby the other is deprived of a right or benefit, e.g. the failure of an employer to re-appoint an administrator or certifier on the resignation of the previously appointed person, or where that person fails or is unwilling to do his duty and the employer will not take steps to rectify the position.

== Contract compliance/governance ==
During the post-award phase, it is important to ensure that contract conditions and terms are met, but it is also critical to take a closer look for items such as unrecorded liabilities, under-reported revenue or overpayments. If these items are overlooked, the margin may be negatively impacted. A contract compliance audit will often commence with an opportunity review to identify the highest risk areas. Having a dedicated contract compliance (and/or governance) program in place has been shown to result in a typical recovery of 2-4% and sometimes as high as 20%.

Current thinking about contract management in complex relationships is shifting from a compliance “management” to a “governance” perspective, with the focus on creating a governance structure in which the parties have a vested interest in managing what are often highly complex contractual arrangements in a more collaborative, aligned, flexible, and credible way. In 1979, Nobel laureate Oliver Williamson wrote that the governance structure is the “framework within which the integrity of a transaction is decided”. He further added that “because contracts are varied and complex, governance structures vary with the nature of the transaction”.

A collaborative governance framework has four components:

- A relationship management structure (how the parties work together to make both day-to-day operational decisions as well as strategic decisions)
- A joint performance and transformation management process designed to track the overall performance of the partnership
- An exit management plan as a controlling mechanism to encourage the organizations to make ethical, proactive changes for the mutual benefit of all the parties.
- Compliance to special concerns and regulations, which include the more traditional components of contract compliance

=== Contracts and trust ===
Another dimension of contract management relates to the interplay between contracts and trust. In particular, management scholars have discussed the nature of the relationship between contract and trust development. On the one hand, some have argued that contracts and trust would substitute each other; that is, the use of one mechanism decreases the advantages of the other. On the other hand, others suggest contract and trust complement each other; that is, the use of one increases the benefits of using the other mechanism.

== Managerial functions ==
In 2008, the International Association for Contract and Commercial Management (IACCM, now World Commerce & Contracting) began a project intended to clarify the role of a contract manager, which has since been updated on several occasions. This work identified that among contract managers themselves, there is a "widespread belief that the title (and its variants, such as Commercial Manager) masks massive variations in job role, status and responsibilities". However, the IACCM's research found indications that "the core responsibilities of Contract Managers (and by deduction, Contract Management Departments) are very similar" and applied across a range of tasks from bid preparation and contract negotiation to a "middleman" role between an organization's employees and its customers, and compliance and ensuring contract close-out, extension or renewal at its end point.

Scholars in business and management have paid attention to the role of contracts in managing relationships between individuals or between organizations. In particular, contracts work as instruments of control and coordination. On the one hand, contracts can moderate the risks of exploitation or misappropriation by an opportunistic partner. On the other hand, contracts can help foster communication and information sharing between parties.

=== Public sector contract management ===
In the UK public sector, concerns were raised by the House of Commons Public Accounts Committee in 2009 regarding resourcing and training in relation to contract management. The committee reported that

No commercial director/head of procurement rated the level of resources allocated to the management of their major contracts as 'good', and 22% of contract managers considered they did not have time to perform their responsibilities well. Most contract managers had undertaken relevant training, although 60% of organisations did not provide a structured training programme for their staff.

Contract management standards were published in 2014 by the Crown Commercial Service, and have been updated periodically. These standards were developed as a result of a 2013 "Cross Government Review of Major Contracts", commissioned by the Cabinet Office to assess the management of major contracts held by the companies G4S and Serco, and led by Bill Crothers, the government's Chief Procurement Officer. Having highlighted previous failings, by September 2014 the UK's National Audit Office (NAO) felt that the government was "starting to improve how it manages its contracts", but important improvement work remained to be done. In December 2016 the NAO re-published a good practice contract management framework which had been first published in 2008 with the help of the Office of Government Commerce, then part of HM Treasury. The NAO "believed", based on practitioner feedback, that this framework was "one of the best references for the basic tasks necessary for good contract management".

John Manzoni, then Chief Executive of the UK's civil service, noted in 2019 that some staff would identify as "contract managers", while other staff carried out a contract management function within the context of a wider role. The UK government has in place a "Contract Management Capability Programme", first developed in October 2018, which aims to develop the skills of government staff involved in contract management roles in either of these capacities. The programme was adapted after the passage of the Procurement Act 2023 to take account of this updated procurement legislation.

In the United States, the National Contract Management Association and the National Association of Government Contractors offer certification in the skills required for government contract management.

== See also ==
- Commercial management
- Contract management software
- Document automation
- Government contract
- National Contract Management Association
- Group purchasing organization
- Office of Federal Contract Compliance Programs – for contracts with the United States government
- Uniform Commercial Code – United States
- United Nations Convention on Contracts for the International Sale of Goods
- Relational contract
- Risk management § Contractual risk management
- Vested outsourcing
