= Juro Novelty Company =

American Toy Company

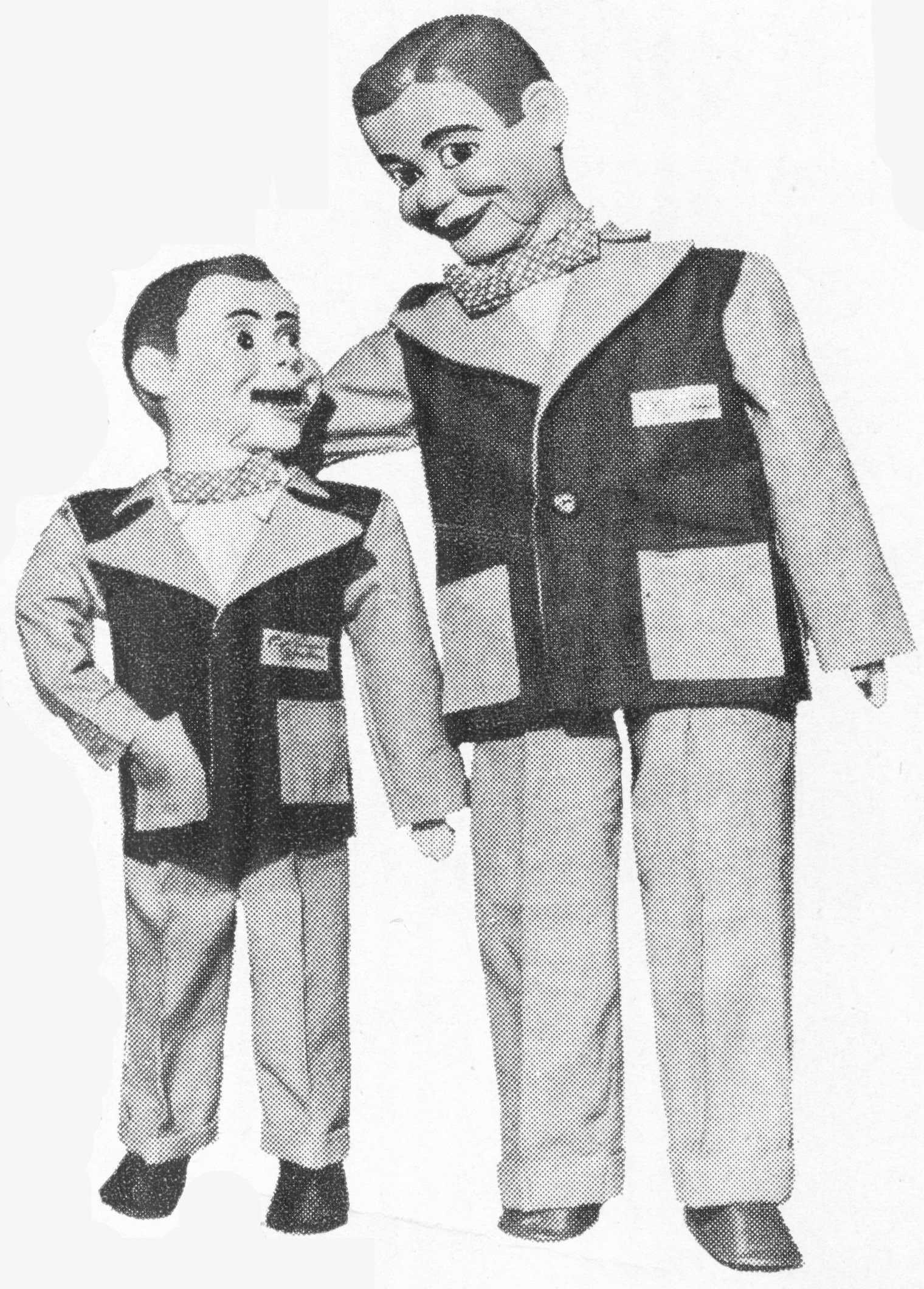
24" tall composition Jerry Mahoney doll (left) and larger, 32" version with hollow body for easy operation. (right) Publicity photo, dated 1952.

Juro Novelty Company was a New York City-based toy company headed by Sam Jupiter, and later by his daughter Vivian Kaplan. Juro manufactured composition ventriloquist dolls from 1949, to approximately 1957, by which time they used plastic for the head and hands instead. They produced toy versions of the following characters: Jerry Mahoney, Knucklehead Smiff, Charlie McCarthy, Mortimer Snerd, Danny O'Day, Farfel, Ricky Little (not to be confused with the I Love Lucy character), Lester, and Velvel. They also made Dick Clark, Dagmar, and Pinky Lee dolls in the 1950s, along with hand puppets of Bil Baird's characters.

All the 24-inch ventriloquist dolls they produced have a pull string in the back of their neck, that open their mouth when pulled. During Juro's heyday, they produced a larger, 32-inch version of Jerry Mahoney, made in the same manner as a professional ventriloquist puppet, with a hollow body and detachable head mounted on a wooden post. They offered many different versions of Jerry, ranging from versions with moving eyes in addition to the moving mouth, to even a battery operated RC version with a microphone and built in speaker. However, unlike the version produced throughout the early 1950s, starting in 1958 the heads were made with a different kind of plastic that is less capable of retaining its original shape over time. This resulted in a very large portion of all heads made in and after 1958 to deform, usually to the point where the mechanics are completely unable to move without being damaged.

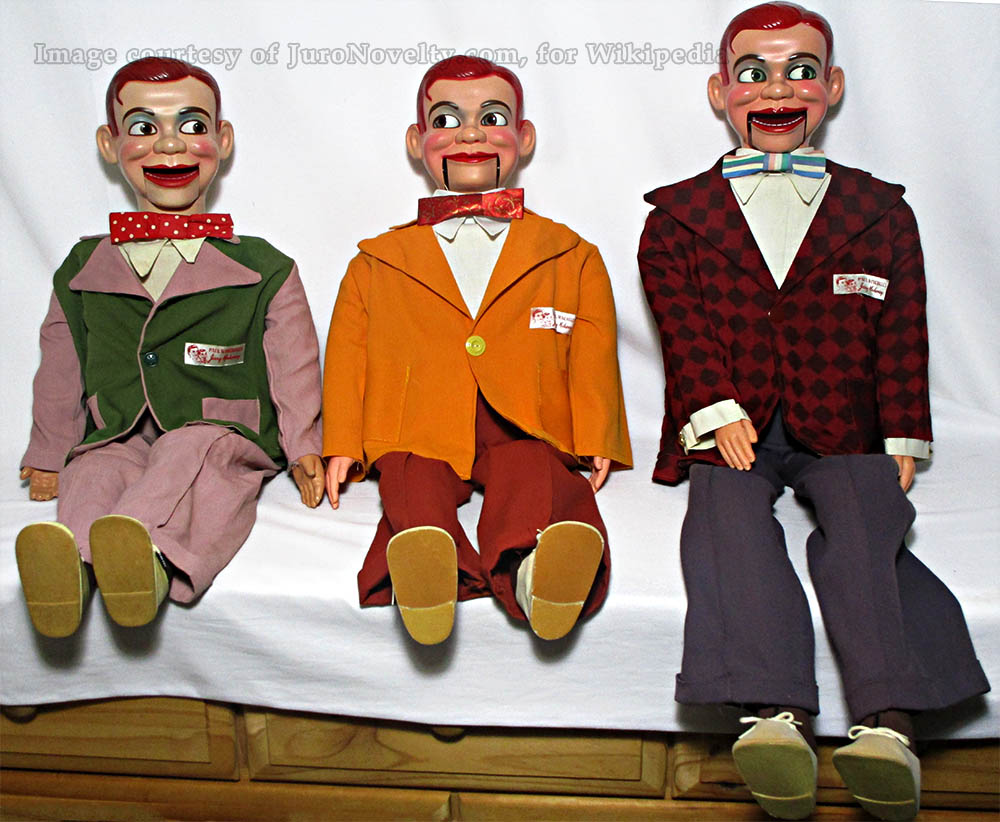
Different versions of Jerry Mahoney produced by Juro. Mid-50s moving mouth only version (left), 1960 moving eyes version (middle), and taller 38" moving eyes version (right)

== Breakup with Paul Winchell and shutdown ==
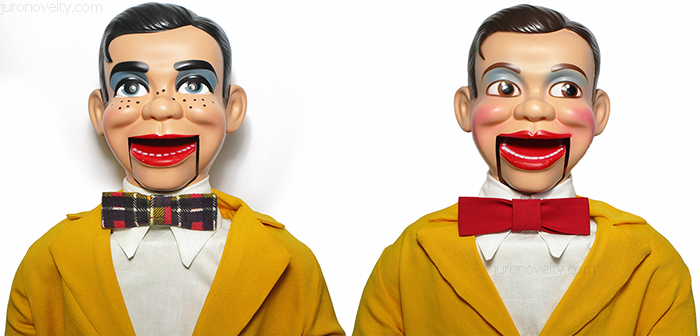
Unauthorized Jerrys made in 1966. All original examples. It is not known if any names were given to these by Juro.

Paul Winchell was unhappy with how the quality of Juro's Jerry Mahoneys went down in later years. In 1966 he terminated his contract with Juro because of this, which likely put a dent in the company, as Jerry was their best-selling product for quite some time. After the break up, Juro began producing unauthorized 32-inch and 38-inch Jerrys. The first version of these Jerrys were almost exactly the same; the only changes were the box art, clothes, and pamphlet. The second version had brown hair instead of red hair, and once again, different clothes. The last version featured a completely new paint job style featuring freckles and jet black hair. The smaller 24-inch Jerrys were replaced by "Ricky Little", a generic version of the 24-inch Jerrys featuring the same body and clothes, but with a different head, although still retaining aspects of Jerry's likeness.

== Downfall ==
Sometime in the 1970s, Sam Jupiter died, leaving his daughter to run the company. Real trouble arouse when Juro got into a legal battle of some kind with "GOLDFARB" in 1977, the same year Juro was sold to Goldberger Doll Co. Goldberger continued to offer all of the same puppets Juro was producing, as well as adding other celebrity characters to their range such as Laurel and Hardy, W. C. Fields, Howdy Doody, Bozo the Clown, and Groucho Marx. Juro remained inactive for 25 years after, until it was finally dissolved in 1992.
