= Juro Tkalčić =

Croatian cellist and composer (1877–1957)

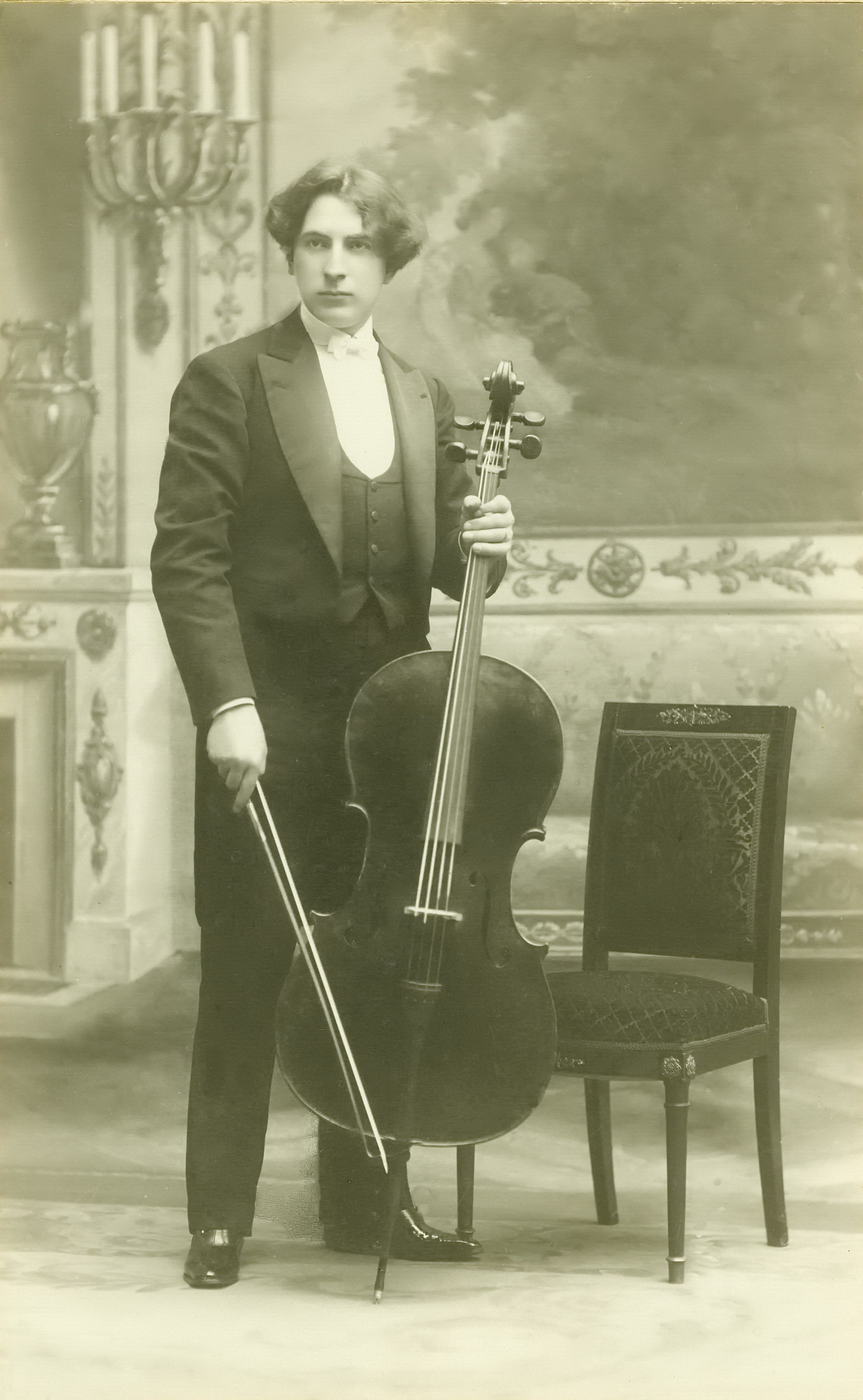
Tkalčić in 1910

Juro Tkalčić (13 February 1877 – 15 December 1957) was a Croatian cellist and composer. He was born and died in Zagreb.
