= Industrial market segmentation =

Industrial market segmentation is a scheme for categorizing industrial and business customers to guide strategic and tactical decision-making. Government agencies and industry associations use standardized segmentation schemes for statistical surveys. Most businesses create their own segmentation scheme to meet their particular needs. Industrial market segmentation is important in sales and marketing.

Webster describes segmentation variables as “customer characteristics that relate to some important difference in customer response to marketing effort”. (Webster, 2003) He recommends the following three criteria:

1. Measurability, “otherwise the scheme will not be operational” according to Webster. While this would be an absolute ideal, its implementation can be next to impossible in some markets. The first barrier is, it often necessitates field research, which is expensive and time-consuming. Second, it is impossible to get accurate strategic data on a large number of customers. Third, if gathered, the analysis of the data can be a daunting task. These barriers lead most companies to use more qualitative and intuitive methods in measuring customer data, and more persuasive methods while selling, hoping to compensate for the gap of accurate data measurement.
2. Substantiality, i.e. “the variable should be relevant to a substantial group of customers”. The challenge here is finding the right size or balance. If the group gets too large, there is a risk of diluting effectiveness; and if the group becomes too small, the company will lose the benefits of economies of scale. Also, as Webster rightly states, there are often very large customers that provide a large portion of a suppliers business. These single customers are sometimes distinctive enough to justify constituting a segment on their own. This scenario is often observed in industries which are dominated by a small number of large companies, e.g. aircraft manufacturing, automotive, turbines, printing machines and paper machines.
3. Operational relevance to marketing strategy. Segmentation should enable a company to offer the suitable operational offering to the chosen segment, e.g. faster delivery service, credit-card payment facility, 24-hour technical service, etc. This can only be applied by companies with sufficient operational resources. For example, just-in-time delivery requires highly efficient and sizeable logistics operations, whereas supply-on-demand would need large inventories, tying down the supplier's capital. Combining the two within the same company – e.g. for two different segments – would stretch the company's resources.

Nevertheless, academics as well as practitioners use various segmentation principles and models in their attempt to bring some sort of structure.

The goal for every industrial market segmentation scheme is to identify the most importantly significant differences among current and potential customers that will influence their purchase decisions or buying behavior, while keeping the scheme as simple as possible (Occam's Razor). This will allow the industrial marketer to differentiate their prices, programs, or solutions for maximum competitive advantage.

While similar to consumer market segmentation, segmenting industrial markets is different and more challenging because of greater complexity in buying processes, buying criteria, and the complexity of industrial products and services themselves. Further additional complications include role of financing, contracting, and complementary products/services.

== Approaches ==
=== A generic principle ===
One of the recommended approaches in segmentation is for a company to decide whether it wants to have a limited number of products offered to many segments or many products offered to a limited number of segments. Some people recommend against businesses offering many product lines to many segments, as this can sometimes soften their focus and stretch their resources too thinly. See figure 1.

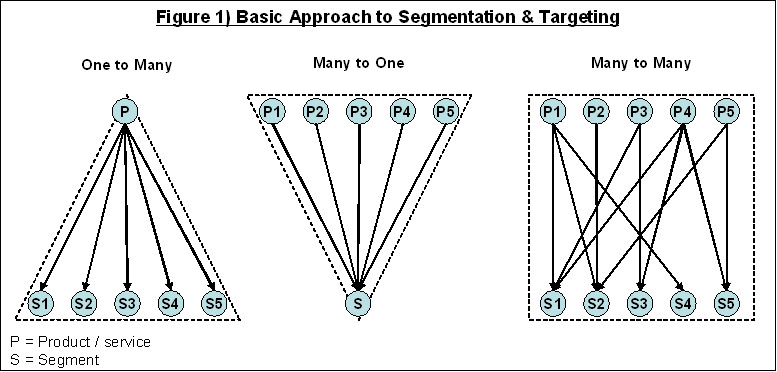
Figure 1

The advantage in attempting the above approach is that although it may not work at all times, it is a force for as much focus as practicable. The one-to-many model ensures – in theory – that a business keeps its focus sharp and makes use of economies of scale at the supply end of the chain. It “kills many birds with one stone”.

Examples are Coca-Cola and some of the General Electric businesses. The drawback is that the business would risk losing business as soon as a weakness in its supply chain or in its marketing forces it to withdraw from the market. Coca-Cola's attempt to sell its Dasani bottled water in the UK turned out to be a flop mainly because it tries to position this “purified tap water” alongside mineral water of other brands. The trigger was a contamination scandal reported in the media.

The many-to-one model also has its benefits and drawbacks. The problem is that a business would stretch its resources too thinly in order to serve just one or a few markets. It can be fatal if the company's image is ruined in its chosen segment. However, there are many companies that have dedicated themselves to only one market segment, e.g. Flowserve is a US-based supplier of many different types of pumps, valves, seals and other components – all dedicated to fluid motion and control.

Among the above models, the most popular is the many-to-many version. As companies constantly try to balance their risk in different technologies and markets, they are left with no choice but to enter into new markets with existing products or introduce new products into existing markets or even develop new products and launch them into new markets (see figure 2).

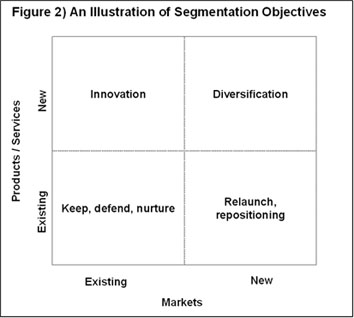

The problem with the many-to-many model is that it can stretch a company's resources too thinly and soften its focus. One reason for the current financial problems of the world's largest car maker, General Motors, is that it has tried to be everything to everybody, launching model after model with no clear segmenting, targeting or branding strategy.

=== Two-stage market segmentation (Wind & Cardozo model) ===
Yoram Wind and Richard Cardozo (1974) suggested industrial market segmentation based on broad two-step classifications of macro-segmentation and micro-segmentation. This model is one of the most common methods applied in industrial markets today. It is sometimes extended into more complex models to include multi-step and three- and four-dimensional models.

Macro-segmentation centres on the characteristics of the buying organisation [as whole companies or institutions], thus dividing the market by:

- Company / organization size: one of the most practical and easily identifiable criterion, it can also be good rough indicator of the potential business for a company. However, it needs to be combined with other factors to draw a realistic picture.
- Geographic location is equally as feasible as company size. It tells a company a lot about culture and communication requirements. For example, a company would adopt a different bidding strategy with an Asian customer than with an American customer. Geographic location also relates to culture, language and business attitudes. For example, Middle Eastern, European, North American, South American and Asian companies will all have different sets of business standards and communication requirements.
- SIC code (standard industry classification), which originated in the US, can be a good indicator for application-based segmentation. However it is based only on relatively standard and basic industries, and product or service classifications such as sheet metal production, springs manufacturing, construction machinery, legal services, cinema's etc. Many industries that use a number of different technologies or have innovative products are classified under the ‘other’ category, which does not bring much benefit if these form the customer base. Examples are access control equipment, thermal spray coatings and uninterruptible power supply systems, non of which have been classified under the SIC.
- Purchasing situation, i.e. new task, modified re-buy or straight re-buy. This is another relatively theoretical and unused criterion in real life. As a result of increased competition and globalisation in most established industries, companies tend to find focus in a small number of markets, get to know the market well and establish long-term relationship with customers. The general belief is, it is cheaper to keep an existing customer than to find a new one. When this happens, the purchase criteria are more based on relationship, trust, technology and overall cost of purchase, which dilutes the importance of this criterion.
- Decision-making stage. This criterion can only apply to newcomers. In cases of long-term relationship, which is usually the objective of most industrial businesses, the qualified supplier is normally aware of the purchase requirement, i.e. they always get into the bidding process right at the beginning. Sheth and Sharma are quoted to have suggested “with increasing turbulence in the marketplace, it is clear that firms have to move away from transaction-oriented marketing strategies and move towards relationship-oriented marketing for enhanced performance”. (Freytag & Clarke, 2001)
- Benefit segmentation: The product's economic value to the customer (Hutt & Speh, 2001), which is one of the more helpful criterion in some industries. It “recognises that customers buy the same products for different reasons, and place different values on particular product features. (Webster, 1991) For example, the access control industry markets the same products for two different value sets: Banks, factories and airports install them for security reasons, i.e. to protect their assets against. However, sports stadiums, concert arenas and the London Underground installs similar equipment in order to generate revenue and/or cut costs by eliminating manual ticket-handling.
- Type of institution, (Webster, 2003) e.g. banks would require designer furniture for their customers while government departments would suffice with functional and durable sets. Hospitals would require higher hygiene criteria while buying office equipment than utilities. And airport terminals would need different degrees of access control and security monitoring than shopping centres.

However, type of buying institution and the decision-making stage can only work on paper. As institutional buyers cut procurement costs, they are forced to reduce the number of suppliers, with whom they develop long-term relationships. This makes the buying institution already a highly experienced one and the suppliers are normally involved at the beginning of the decision-making process. This eliminates the need to apply these two items as segmentation criteria.

- Customers’ business potential assuming supply can be guaranteed and prices are acceptable by a particular segment. For example, ‘global accounts’ would buy high quantities and are prepared to sign long-term agreements; ‘key accounts’ medium-sized regional customers that can be the source of 30% of a company's revenue as long as competitive offering is in place for them; ‘direct accounts’ form many thousands of small companies that buy mainly on price but in return are willing to forego service.
- Purchasing strategies, e.g. global vs. local decision-making structure, decision-making power of purchasing officers vs. engineers or technical specifiers.
- Supply Chain Position: A customer’ business model affects where and how they buy. If he pursues a cost leadership strategy, then the company is more likely to be committed to high-volume manufacturing, thus requiring high-volume purchasing. To the supplier, this means constant price pressure and precise delivery but relatively long-term business security, e.g. in the commodities markets. But if the company follows a differentiation strategy, then it is bound to offer customised products and services to its customers. This would necessitate specialised high-quality products from the supplier, which are often purchased in low volumes, which mostly eliminates stark price competition, emphasises on functionality and requires relationship-based marketing mix. (Sudharshan, 1998)

Micro-segmentation on the other hand requires a higher degree of knowledge. While macro-segmentation put the business into broad categories, helping a general product strategy, micro-segmentation is essential for the implementation of the concept. “Micro-segments are homogeneous groups of buyers within the macro-segments” (Webster, 2003). Macro-segmentation without micro-segmentation cannot provide the expected benefits to the organisation. Micro-segmentation focuses on factors that matter in the daily business; this is where “the rubber hits the road”. The most common criteria include the characteristics of the decision-making units within each macro-segment, (Hutt & Speh, 2001) e.g.:

- Buying decision criteria (product quality, delivery, technical support, price, supply continuity). “The marketer might divide the market based on supplier profiles that appear to be preferred by decision-makers, e.g. high quality – prompt delivery – premium price vs. standard quality – less-prompt delivery – low price”. (Hutt & Speh, 2001)
- Purchasing strategy, which falls into two categories, according to Hutt and Speh: First, there are companies who contact familiar suppliers (some have vendor lists) and place the order with the first supplier that fulfils the buying criteria. These tend to include more OEM's than public sector buyers. Second, organisations that consider a larger number of familiar and unfamiliar suppliers, solicit bids, examine all proposals and place the order with the best offer. Experience has shown that considering this criterion as part of the segmentation principles can be highly beneficial, as the supplier can avoid unnecessary costs by, for example not spending time and resources unless officially approved in the buyer's vendor list.
- Structure of the decision-making unit can be one of the most effective criteria. Knowing the decision-making process has been shown to make the difference between winning and losing a contract. If this is the case, the supplier can develop a suitable relationship with the person / people that has / have real decision-making power. For example, the medical equipment market can be segmented on the basis of the type of institution and the responsibilities of the decision makers, according to Hutt and Speh. A company that sells protective coatings for human implants would adapt a totally different communication strategy for doctors than hip-joint manufacturers.
- Perceived importance of the product to the customer's business (e.g. automotive transmission, or peripheral equipment, e.g. manufacturing tool)
- Attitudes towards the supplier: Personal characteristics of buyers (age, education, job title and decision style) play a major role in forming the customers purchasing attitude as whole. Is the decision-maker a partner, supporter, neutral, adversarial or an opponent? Industrial power systems are best “sold” to engineering executive than purchasing managers; industrial coatings are sold almost exclusively to engineers; matrix and raw materials are sold normally to purchasing managers or even via web auctions.

The above criteria can be highly beneficial depending on the type of business. However, they may be feasible to measure only in high-capital, high-expense businesses such as corporate banking or aircraft business due to high cost associated with compiling the desired data. “There are serious concerns in practice regarding the cost and difficulty of collecting measurements of these micro-segmentation characteristics and using them”. (Sudharshan, 1998)

The prerequisite to implementing a full-scale macro- and micro-segmentation concept is the company's size and the organisational set-up. A company needs to have beyond the certain number of customers for a segmentation model to work. Smaller companies would not need a formal segmentation model as they know their customers in person, so they can apply Hunter's n=1 model.

Ironically, Webster states that “the strategic implications of micro-segmentation lie primarily in promotional strategy. ….. Decisions influenced by micro-segments include selecting individuals for the sales call, design of sales presentations and selecting the advertising media” (Webster, 2003). However, promotion should not be seen in isolation, as it cannot facilitate log-lasting success, unless supported on all the relevant functions such as product, price and place. One only needs to consider that purchasing criteria (part of micro-segmentation) includes factors such as product quality, price and delivery, which are directly relevant to product, price and place.

=== Nested approach to segmentation (Bonoma & Shapiro model) ===
Taking the Wind & Cardozo model, Bonoma & Shapiro extended this into a multi-step approach in 1984. As the application of all the criteria recommended by Wind and Cardozo and subsequent scholars who expanded upon their two-stage theory became increasingly difficult due to the complexity of modern businesses, Bonoma and Shapiro suggest that the same / similar criteria be applied in multi-process manner to allow flexibility to marketers in selecting or avoiding the criteria as suited to their businesses. They proposed the use of the following five general segmentation criteria which they arranged in a nested hierarchy:

1. On a macro segmentation level:

1. Demographics: industry, company size, customer location
2. Operating variables: company technology, product/brand use status, customer capabilities
3. Purchasing approaches: purchasing function, power structure, buyer-seller relationships, purchasing policies, purchasing criteria

2. On a micro segmentation level:

1. Situational factors: urgency of order, product application, size of order
2. Buyers’ personal characteristics: character, approach

The idea was that the marketers would move from the outer nest toward the inner, using as many nests as necessary”. (Kalafatis & Cheston, 1997). As a result, this model has become one of the most adapted in the market, rivalling the Wind & Cardozo model head-on. One of the problems with the nested approach “is that there is no clear-cut distinction between purchasing approaches, situational factors and demographics". Bonoma and Shapiro are aware of these overlaps and argue that the nested approach is intended to be used flexibly with a good deal of managerial judgment” (Webster, 2003).

=== Bottom-up approach (Kotler model) ===
Kotler suggests a “build-up” approach, where masses of customer data are studied and similarities searched to make up segments that have similar needs, i.e. "assessing the customer base quantitatively and grouping them – i.e. building up – the segments based on similarities in purchasing attitude" (Kotler, 2001).

When starting the segmentation process, instead of seeing customers as identical, the build-up approach begins by viewing customer as different and then proceed to identify possible similarities between them. "In a turbulence market (pretty much all markets today), using a build-up approach is more suitable than a breakdown approach” (Freytag & Clarke, 2001).

== Targeting and positioning ==
One of the most significant uses of industrial market segmentation schemes is to make targeting and product positioning decisions. Companies chose to target some segments and downplay or avoid other segments in order to maximize their competitive advantage and the likelihood of success.

"There is a critical difference in emphasis between target market and [target] audience. The term audience is probably most useful in marketing communication". (Croft, 1999) Target markets can include end user companies, procurement managers, company bosses, contracting companies and external sales agents. Audiences, however, can include individuals that have influence over purchasing decision, but may not necessarily buy a product themselves, e.g. design engineers, architects, project managers and operations managers, plus those in target markets.

Croft quotes Friestad, Write, Boush and Rose (1994) as stating that because the purpose of advertising is to persuade, consumers become sceptical of its methods and approaches [and indeed intentions]. However, while this may be entirely true in consumer marketing, the level of trust and reliance on marketing communication by industrial customers is fairly high due to the professional experience and knowledge of the industrial buyer. Some even appreciate advertising because it keeps them informed of the products and services available in the market.

== Supplier segmentation ==
In the area of marketing, industrial market segmentation usually refers to the demand side of the market, the goal being for companies to segment groups of potential customers with similar wants and demands that may respond to a particular marketing mix. When companies also work with potentially different suppliers, segmenting the supply side of the market can be very valuable as well. There are many supplier segmentation approaches in the literature: Parasuraman (1980), Kraljic (1983), Dyer et al. (1998), Olsen and Ellram (1997), Bensaou (1999), Kaufman et al. (2000), van Weele (2000), Hallikas et al. (2005), Rezaei and Ortt (2012).

Parasuraman (1980) proposed a stepwise procedure to implement this approach: Step 1: Identify the key features of customer segments Step 2: Identify the critical supplier characteristics Step 3: Select the relevant variables for supplier segmentation, and Step 4: Identify the supplier segments.

Kraljic (1983) considered two variables: profit impact and supply risk. The profit impact of a given supply item can be defined in terms of the volume purchased, the percentage of total purchase cost or the impact on product quality or business growth. Supply risk is assessed in terms of the availability and number of suppliers, competitive demand, make-or-buy opportunities, storage risks and substitution possibilities. Based on these two variables, materials or components can be divided into four supply categories: (1) non-critical items (supply risk: low; profit impact: low), (2) leverage items, (supply risk: low; profit impact: high), (3) bottleneck items (supply risk: high; profit impact: low), and (4) strategic items (supply risk: high; profit impact: high). Each category requires a specific supplier strategy.

To see the theoretical bases of, and to review, different supplier segmentation approaches see Day et al. (2010), and Rezaei and Ortt (2012).

Rezaei and Ortt (2012) considering two dimensions "supplier willingness" and "supplier capabilities" defined supplier segmentation as follows.

"Supplier segmentation is the identification of the capabilities and willingness of suppliers by a particular buyer in order for the buyer to engage in a strategic and effective partnership with the suppliers with regard to a set of evolving business functions and activities in the supply chain management".

Considering two levels low and high for the two dimensions, suppliers are segmented to four segments.

== See also ==
- Industry classification
