= Supplier performance management =

Supplier performance management (SPM) is a business practice which extends supplier evaluation, and is used to measure, analyze, and manage the performance of a supplier in an effort to cut costs, alleviate risks, and drive continuous improvement. It is a function often associated with third party management. The ultimate intent is to identify potential issues and their root causes so that they can be resolved to everyone’s benefit as early as possible. It is a similar term to vendor performance management, with the terms "vendor" and "supplier" being interchangeable.

== Overview ==
A company that deploys effective supplier performance management ensures that a supplier’s performance meets the expectations defined in the contract and market norms. It includes the management of actual performance, identification of performance gaps, and agreement of actions to achieve desired performance levels. SPM not only ensures that those benefits identified in the contracting stage are delivered, but that value delivery continues for the life of the contract. As companies increasingly focus on their core competencies and outsource a greater percentage of work, their success becomes ever more dependent on the performance of strategic suppliers. Ultimately, the objective of SPM is to improve the performance of all parties involved in the contract and service level agreement.

== Performance measures ==
A range of performance measures are recommended, which should be selected according to business need. As in other contexts for performance management, measures which are specific, measurable, assignable, realistic and time-related ("SMART") have been recommended. Measures should be agreed within a contract with the supplier or in a statement of work.
