= National Association of Government Contractors =

Logo of the National Association of Government Contractors.

The National Association of Government Contractors (NAGC) is a national trade association based in Washington, D.C., United States, for business owners engaged or interested in contracts with government, universities, and private corporations. NAGC was founded in 1957 and it has over 120,000 members.

== See also ==
- Defense contractor
- Government procurement in the United States
- List of United States defense contractors
- Top 100 Contractors of the U.S. federal government
