= Contract lifecycle management =

Aspect of contract law

Contract lifecycle management (CLM) is the systematic management of contracts throughout their lifecycle, from initiation and negotiation to execution, compliance, renewal, and termination. CLM aims to improve operational efficiency, reduce legal and financial risk, and ensure contractual obligations are met. Implementing CLM can lead to significant improvements in cost savings and efficiency. Understanding contract lifecycle management and using contract lifecycle management software to automate CLM processes can help to limit organizational liability and improve compliance with legal requirements.

== Stages ==
There are many different phases of each contract – no matter the size or importance of any particular document, they must all go through each stage in order to be completed properly. As well as formation of contracts, contract lifecycle management addresses processes after contract signature or execution such as ensure parties comply with their contractual obligations, continuing compliance and dispute resolution.

The stages of the contract lifecycle management process include:

1. Contract Requests - The start of every contract involves the actual request. This is the phase where involved parties gather all the relevant information and data they need in order to create a contract that works for both sides. The request stage is arguably one of the most important stages of the contract lifecycle and can take some time depending on who is involved.
2. Contract Authoring - This is the stage where the contract actually gets written. Both parties put their terms into writing and ‘solidify’ their clauses and relevant information relating to their contractual obligations.
3. Contract Negotiations - The negotiation stages are where both parties continue to negotiate specific contract parameters – this is the stage that directly precedes final approval. Negotiations can be very quick or prolonged – it entirely depends on the method of negotiation, the involved parties, the scale of the contract, how many people are involved, etc. Use of contract lifecycle management software can drastically reduce the amount of time spent in the negotiation phase.
4. Contract Approval - Once both sides have agreed on the various terms, clauses and dates relating to the particular contract, it can now be approved. Department heads, executives, and other senior stakeholders may need to get involved at this phase of the contract to ensure everything is as it needs to be. Once the contract gets the approval from the relevant departments and/or personnel, the contract can then be signed.
5. Contract Signature - In the signature phase, the contract is signed by whoever needs to sign it in order to become official (who signs the contract is unique to each business). If contract lifecycle management software is used, the signature stage can be done electronically via the internet which drastically reduces the amount of time this stage takes.
6. Contract Obligation - Each involved party and personnel will have their own set of responsibilities and obligations pertaining to the specific contract.
7. Contract Compliance - Compliance means the involved parties and personnel all keep to their various obligations. Without a proper system or contract lifecycle management software, compliance can be difficult to keep track of and can result in legal ramifications, late fees, bottlenecks, and other business hazards.
8. Contract Renewal - After a document is expired (or when it is nearing expiration) a contract must be renewed and renegotiated. Contract lifecycle management software makes it easy for businesses to keep track of expiry dates and upcoming renewals.

Recent trends in contract lifecycle management include the integration of AI-powered review tools and workflow automation to accelerate contract negotiation and improve compliance tracking.

== Recent trends in CLM solutions ==
Recent developments in Contract Lifecycle Management (CLM) software reflect a shift from basic electronic document storage and workflow automation toward intelligent and AI‑enhanced platforms. CLM systems manage the entire lifecycle of contracts — including creation, negotiation, approval, execution, performance, renewal, and termination — with the aim of improving operational efficiency, ensuring compliance, and reducing organizational risk.

=== Technological evolution ===
Modern CLM solutions increasingly incorporate artificial intelligence (AI) and machine learning to automate and augment traditional contract management tasks. These capabilities include AI‑assisted contract drafting, clause extraction, risk scoring, and compliance verification, which reduce manual workload and provide deeper insights into contractual obligations and exposures. Advanced analytics and natural language processing enable organizations to transform contract data into strategic information for decision making. For example, generative AI is used to assist with contract review and management by highlighting significant provisions and explaining their potential effects in a manner accessible to non-specialists. Drawing on patterns from prior negotiations, these systems can propose standardized or preferred contractual wording, contributing to greater efficiency and uniformity in contract development. Generative AI tools may also produce concise summaries of extensive contractual documents, supporting communication and coordination across different organizational roles and improving overall awareness of contractual responsibilities and considerations.

In addition to core CLM functions, integration with enterprise resource planning (ERP), customer relationship management (CRM), and other corporate systems enhances cross‑functional visibility and aligns contract workflows with broader business processes. Cloud‑based deployment models have also become prevalent, offering scalability, remote access, and real‑time collaboration capabilities. At the same time, lighter‑weight CLM offerings have emerged to serve small and medium‑sized organizations with streamlined feature sets and lower barriers to adoption.

Security and regulatory compliance remain central features of CLM platforms, with many solutions incorporating encryption, role‑based access control, and automated audit trails to support legal and compliance requirements.

=== Market adoption ===
The CLM software market is expanding globally as organizations across industries seek to modernize contract operations in response to digital transformation initiatives and increasingly complex regulatory environments. Demand for CLM solutions has been driven by the need to reduce contract cycle times, improve governance, and leverage contract analytics in strategic planning.

=== Representative solutions ===
A number of commercial CLM products and services are available worldwide, ranging from enterprise‑grade systems to specialized applications tailored to particular industries. Cloud-based platforms such as Juro utilize browser-native editors and generative AI to automate contract workflows and data extraction for corporate legal teams. In South Korea, for example, LawFormBusiness is a representative AI‑powered CLM solution that provides comprehensive support for corporate legal operations, including contract drafting, management, and analysis. Such systems demonstrate the application of modern CLM technologies in meeting the evolving needs of corporate contract management.
