= Hasso Plattner =

German businessman and philanthropist (born 1944)

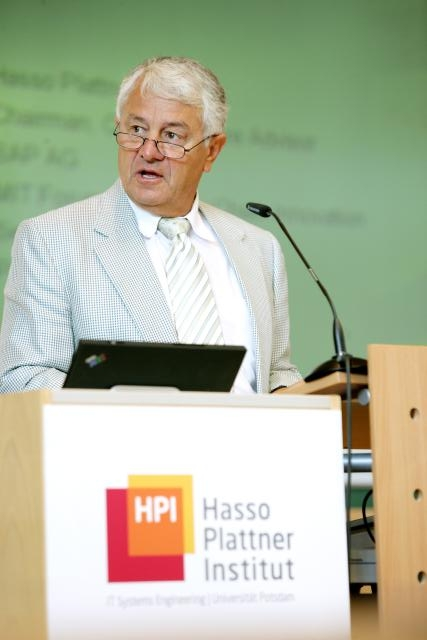
- Plattner in 2010
- Born: 21 January 1944 (age 82); Berlin, Germany
- Education: University of Karlsruhe
- Occupations: Entrepreneur, philanthropist
- Known for: Founder of SAP SE; Majority owner of the San Jose Sharks
- Title: Chairman of SAP SE
- Spouse: Sabine Plattner
- Children: 2

Hasso Plattner (born 21 January 1944) is a German businessman who is the co-founder of SAP SE software company. From 2003 to 2024, he was the chairman of the company's supervisory board. As of August 2020, Forbes estimated his net worth at US$17.9 billion.

== Early life ==
Plattner was born to German ophthalmologist Horst Plattner (1918–2001) and his wife shortly before the end of the Second World War, in Berlin. He grew up in Bavaria and completed his masters degree in communications engineering from the University of Karlsruhe in 1968.

== Career ==
In 1972, Plattner and four colleagues left IBM to launch SAP, where he eventually was co-chief executive (together with Henning Kagermann) from 1998. He stepped down in 2003 at age 60.

From 2003 to 2024, Plattner chaired the company's supervisory board and played an influential role in the company's governance, orchestrating the hiring of co-CEOs Jennifer Morgan and Christian Klein in 2019. He has reduced his stake in SAP several times; as of 2020, he owned a 5.89% stake, making him the company's largest individual shareholder.

In 1998, Plattner founded the non-profit Hasso Plattner Institute (HPI). He is Chair of Enterprise Platform and Integration Concepts and Professor of Enterprise Systems at HPI.

In 2005, Plattner set up his own venture capital fund, Hasso Plattner Ventures, with more than 25 million euros. By December 2009, HPV managed €150 million and had 17 companies in its portfolio, including online cruise portals Dreamlines. An affiliate fund, HPV Africa in Cape Town, was founded in 2008, with €29 million, and soon invested in five companies. Plattner provides the lion's share of this investment capital. In September 2010, HPV invested $6 million in Israeli software company Panaya in exchange for the company's stakes.

== Sporting interests ==
In 2005, Plattner's maxZ86 maxi yacht set a record at the Transpacific Yacht Race and was the scratch boat when it led a five-boat assault on the record for monohulls. She finished the race in 6 days, 16 hours, 4 minutes, and 11 seconds to win "the Barn Door" trophy, a slab of carved koa wood traditionally awarded to the monohull with the fastest elapsed time. In 2013, he won the German Dragon Championship as part of a three-man crew that included Hamish Pepper.

Plattner is a keen golfer. In 1994, he acquired the Fancourt Hotel and Country Club, which has three Gary Player-designed championship courses, in addition to the CordeValle Golf Club in San Martin, California. The Links of Fancourt staged the 2003 Presidents Cup matches between the US and an international team, captained by Gary Player.

Plattner is also an investor in San Jose Sports & Entertainment Enterprises, which owns the San Jose Sharks, and other related properties as well as managing the city owned SAP Center at San Jose. In 2013, he bought out two of the partners in SJS&E, and began as the Sharks' representative on the National Hockey League's board of governors. However, general manager Mike Grier and his staff run the hockey operations.

== Philanthropy ==
Plattner signed The Giving Pledge in February 2013. In 2015, he set up the Hasso Plattner Foundation and the charity's activities span education, art and culture, and conservation. Since 2017, the foundation has been headquartered at Villa Wunderkind in Potsdam, the former home of German fashion designer Wolfgang Joop.

=== HIV/AIDS ===
Plattner has had strong connections with South Africa over the years and spends some of his time living there, while participating in charitable work. In the fight against AIDS, he supports the universities of KwaZulu Natal and Cape Town.

Plattner's donation of €6 million for the Isombululo programme for the prevention and treatment of HIV/AIDS was announced at the Presidents Cup, one of the world's leading international golf tournaments in 2003 and it is suggested that this amount will have helped 360,000 people. In the spring of 2005, Plattner personally covered the costs of the 46664 benefit concert, which took place at his Gary Player-designed golf course, The Links of Fancourt in George which is near Cape Town and which was broadcast globally on television. Proceeds went towards the Global Fund to Fight AIDS, Tuberculosis and Malaria, an organisation co-founded by former South African president Nelson Mandela.

=== Architecture and visual arts ===
Plattner contributed more than €20 million which enabled reconstruction of the historic exterior of the Stadtschloss in Potsdam, which had damaged during World War II and demolished in 1959. At the time, it was the largest donation ever gifted in Germany by a single individual.

In 2016, Plattner joined forces with art dealer Guy Wildenstein to form the Wildenstein Plattner Institute, a foundation dedicated to advancing art historical scholarship by fostering the accessibility, cataloguing, and digitisation of primary sources.

Plattner also helped in the establishment of the Museum Barberini, devoted to his holdings of modern and Impressionist art, as well as artists active in the former German Democratic Republic (GDR). For the museum, he purchased one of Monet’s 1890 Meules paintings for $110.7 million at a 2019 Sotheby's auction, making it the most high-priced Impressionist work ever sold at auction. In 2022, he opened Das Minsk, another private museum in Potsdam, which focuses on East German artists who were active after the fall of the Berlin wall.

=== Research ===
Since his retirement from SAP, Plattner has been particularly active as a benefactor in the field of technological research. Media reports have named him one of Germany's most important private sponsors of scientific research. In 1998, Plattner founded the Hasso Plattner Institute for software systems engineering based at the University of Potsdam, and in Palo Alto, California, its sole source of funding being the non-profit Hasso Plattner Foundation for Software Systems Engineering. Plattner has pledged €50 million of his personal fortune over a period of 20 years. Since its foundation, Plattner's commitment to the HPI has quadrupled to over €200 million. He not only fully finances the HPI, but is also actively involved as a director and lecturer in Enterprise Platforms and Integration Concepts.

In October 2005, with a donation of US$35 million, Plattner founded the Hasso Plattner Institute of Design at Stanford University. Students of varying disciplines have been charged with the development of user-friendly innovations. Another of Plattner's pledges to promote science was of €10 million to redevelop the library at the University of Mannheim, Germany, given in 2003.

== Recognition ==
On 21 January 2004, at a ceremony at the Hasso Plattner Institute celebrating the 60th birthday of its founder, German Chancellor Gerhard Schröder made the following comments on Plattner's achievements: "We need more Hasso Plattners and more SAPs in order to get Germany moving again economically." According to the Chancellor, Plattner created an international corporation proving "that German companies can be at the top of the technological hierarchy worldwide". In an interview in August 2004, management consultant Roland Berger named Hasso Plattner as one of the five Germans who have made the greatest impression on him. In the Welt am Sonntag article Berger pointed out how Plattner founded, built up and adapted SAP to a changing market was a "master achievement".

=== Honorary degrees ===
Plattner received his honorary doctorate in 2002, and his honorary professorship in 2004 from the University of Potsdam. He had also received an honorary doctorate (1990) and an honorary professorship in Information Systems (1994) from the Saarland University, Saarbrücken. The same university named him an honorary senator in 1998.

=== Awards ===
- 2014 – Leonardo European Corporate Learning Award, "Thought Leadership" category
- 2015 – GABA Lifetime Achievement Award, presented by the German American Business Association (GABA)
- 2016 – Prize for Understanding and Tolerance, presented by the Jewish Museum Berlin
- 2017 – Werner von Siemens Ring

== Personal life ==
Plattner is married to Sabine Plattner, a former teacher. The couple has two daughters, who grew up in Heidelberg, Germany.

Plattner lives in San Jose, California, which he considers his 'adopted home'. Since his retirement from SAP he hasn't visited Germany. The family also maintains residences in Potsdam's Babelsberg district, Sylt and Yzerfontein.

== See also ==
- Dietmar Hopp
- Claus Wellenreuther
- Klaus Tschira
- Hans-Werner Hector (in German)
