= SAP Cloud Infrastructure =

Private computing cloud

- SAP Cloud Infrastructure
- Developer: SAP SE
- Release: 2012; 14 years ago
- Website: SAP Cloud Infrastructure

SAP Cloud Infrastructure is an SAP-operated IaaS cloud platform, used to run SAP’s cloud business and customer-facing deployments for SAP and non-SAP workloads.

It is developed and operated with open-source technologies within SAP’s data center network, based on OpenStack and Kubernetes and supporting SAP S/4HANA and general-purpose applications. It offers compute, storage, and platform services that are accessible to SAP customers.

== History ==
In 2012, SAP promoted aspects of cloud computing. In October 2012, SAP announced a platform as a service called the SAP Cloud Platform. In May 2013, a managed private cloud called the S/4HANA Enterprise Cloud service was announced.

SAP Converged Cloud was announced in January 2015. SAP Converged Cloud was originally developed as SAP's internal standardized Infrastructure as a Service (IaaS) offering to support SAP’s cloud solutions. Originating from SAP Converged Cloud, SAP Cloud Infrastructure was developed and announced as SAP’s cloud computing offering that is provided for both SAP and customer workloads. In 2025, it had a global footprint of 15 regions and 29 data centers, encompassing more than 200,000 active VMs and over 6,000 hypervisors.

In September 2025, SAP announced an expansion of its European “SAP Sovereign Cloud” portfolio, explicitly naming SAP Cloud Infrastructure (alongside SAP Sovereign Cloud On-Site) as part of the stack positioned for public sector and regulated environments.

In April 2026, SAP announced the successful completion of ISO/IEC 27001 certification on the basis of IT-Grundschutz for the physical infrastructure of its SAP-owned data centers in Germany (Walldorf/St. Leon-Rot), confirming that physical, environmental and facility-level controls had been independently audited against the BSI IT-Grundschutz methodology. In June 2026, the BSI granted SAP an authorization to use for processing information classified VS-NfD (Verschlusssache — Nur für den Dienstgebrauch, translated by SAP as "Restricted — For Official Use Only") on SAP Cloud Infrastructure in Walldorf/St. Leon-Rot, following an evaluation of approximately twelve months. SAP described the step as a basis for a subsequent full BSI approval and recertification of ISO/IEC 27001 on the basis of IT-Grundschutz.

== Services and Features ==
SAP Cloud Infrastructure (SCI) is an infrastructure-as-a-service (IaaS) offering by SAP that provides virtual compute, storage, and networking services, together with identity, key management, and operational services. SCI follows a self-service model and is managed via APIs and a web-based user interface.

=== Compute ===
SCI provides virtual machine instances that can be provisioned from operating system images and selected in predefined sizes (“flavors”). It supports lifecycle operations such as create/modify/resize/delete, power control, and snapshots; instances can be organized into server groups to influence placement policies.

=== Storage ===
SCI provides persistent storage services including:

- Block storage (virtual volumes) with attach/detach to instances, online expansion, cloning, snapshots, and provisioning volumes from images or snapshots.
- Object storage (containers and objects) managed via API/CLI with access control lists (ACLs) and configurable redundancy options.
- File storage (shared file systems) with access controls, online resize, snapshots/restore, and replication across availability zones.

=== Networking ===
SCI provides software-defined networking (SDN) for tenant networks (networks, subnets, routers) and connectivity features such as floating IPs for public reachability. Network security controls include security groups and firewall policies; connectivity options include BGP-based VPN networking.

=== Load balancing and DNS ===
SCI includes managed load balancing for distributing traffic across backend instances and an authoritative DNS service (DNSaaS) with API-based management of DNS zones and records, including options for zone sharing/transfer across projects/tenants and service integrations for automated record creation.

=== Identity, access, and key management ===
SCI includes identity and access management for authentication/authorization in projects/tenants (for example token handling, role assignment, and credential management) and key/secrets management for storing and controlling access to secret material such as keys and certificates, including support for different backends (depending on configuration).

=== Cloud-native services ===
SCI includes a container image registry (image push/pull, access policies, and lifecycle controls) and an auto-scaling capability for file shares based on configurable rules.

=== Observability and audit ===
SCI includes metrics and audit logging capabilities for operational monitoring and for listing/filtering audit-relevant events across services.

=== Availability and service levels ===
SCI documentation describes availability-related features such as load balancing, storage redundancy options, and replication for file shares across availability zones. SAP cloud services are governed by contractual service-level agreements (SLA); SAP Cloud Infrastructure references an SLA supplement defining infrastructure-specific terms when referenced in order forms.

=== SAP cloud services ===
SAP cloud services can run on different underlying infrastructures, including SAP Cloud Infrastructure in addition to SAP NS2 or hyperscalers. SAP cloud solutions available on SAP Cloud Infrastructure include SAP Cloud ERP, SAP HCM, SAP Solutions for Spend Management, Supply Chain Management, Business Transformation Management, and SAP Business Technology Platform (including related analytics and business data solutions). For example, SAP HANA Cloud documentation lists SAP Cloud Infrastructure as one of the supported infrastructures alongside hyperscalers.

=== Sustainability ===
SAP describes sustainability initiatives for its data centers, including energy-efficient infrastructure (for example, advanced cooling systems and power management), renewable electricity usage where feasible, and operational practices such as recycling electronic waste and minimizing water usage. SAP also references environmental management and energy management standards such as ISO 14001 and ISO 50001 for its data center operations.

SAP-owned data centers run with 100% renewable electricity and that renewable electricity has been used since 2014 to power SAP facilities including owned data centers and co-locations.

== SAP Cloud Infrastructure for SAP Sovereign Cloud ==
SAP Sovereign Cloud is a portfolio of SAP solutions designed to help organizations adopt SAP cloud solutions such as the SAP Cloud ERP while maintaining control over data, infrastructure, and compliance in line with local laws and regulations. The portfolio offers multiple deployment options, including SAP Cloud Infrastructure and SAP Sovereign Cloud On-Site, alongside sovereign hyperscaler-based options such as via SAP NS2, and targets customers such as public-sector bodies and other highly regulated organizations.

In Europe, SAP Cloud Infrastructure is an Infrastructure-as-a-Service (IaaS) deployment option within SAP Sovereign Cloud for SAP and customer / third party workloads, operated on SAP’s data center network and developed using open-source technologies, with customer data stored within the European Union.

Sovereignty-related characteristics for the SAP Cloud Infrastructure include:

- EU footprint and ownership model: SAP-operated data centers in Germany include sites in St. Leon-Rot and Walldorf, and co-location sites in Frankfurt.
- Availability zones and secure interconnect: Three availability zones in three independent data centers in Germany, interconnected via SAP-owned fibre infrastructure.
- IT-Grundschutz certification of physical infrastructure: In April 2026, SAP completed ISO/IEC 27001 certification on the basis of IT-Grundschutz for the physical infrastructure of its SAP-owned data centers in Germany, confirming that physical protections, environmental safeguards and facility-level operational processes meet BSI expectations.
- VS-NfD authorization: In June 2026, the BSI granted SAP an authorization to use for processing information classified VS-NfD (Verschlusssache — Nur für den Dienstgebrauch, translated by SAP as "Restricted — For Official Use Only") on SAP Cloud Infrastructure in Walldorf/St. Leon-Rot. The deployment uses German security hardware components authorized by the BSI for VS-NfD processing and is operated by security-cleared personnel; SAP positions the authorization as a basis for a subsequent full BSI approval.
- EU AI Cloud: EU AI Cloud is a sovereign AI offering for Europe that provides secure, compliant environments for building and running AI, including governed access to auditable large language models from SAP and partners. It offers AI models on the SAP Cloud Infrastructure and SAP Business Technology Platform (SAP BTP), enabling deployment of AI applications and models on high-performance European infrastructure (including accelerator/GPU-based compute for AI workloads).
- Facility and security standards:
  - ISO/IEC 27001 governance of delivery and operations of SAP cloud services and SAP-owned data centers, including ISO/IEC 27001 on the basis of IT-Grundschutz for the physical infrastructure of SAP’s German data centers.
  - Additional facility and operational standards referenced for SAP’s German data centers include BSI C5 Type II, KRITIS/NIS 2, TSI Level 3 (extended), ISO 22301, SOC 1 Type 2 and SOC 2 Type 2, EN 50600 and ISO/IEC 22237 (availability class 3).
- Technology foundation: Based on the open-source cloud infrastructure framework OpenStack and Kubernetes, without dependencies on hyperscaler technologies.
- Sovereignty controls: Data sovereignty (data residency in local or approved-country data centers); operational sovereignty (sensitive operations restricted to approved personnel — local nationals or those from trusted countries — with required security clearance); technical sovereignty (locally hosted control planes with separation enforced through encryption or dedicated infrastructure); and legal sovereignty (governance through locally based legal entities or those in approved countries, with mitigation of foreign-authority ownership, control and influence risks).
- C3A self-assessment: SAP references a self-assessment against the BSI C3A (Criteria enabling Cloud Computing Autonomy) catalog for SAP Cloud Infrastructure as part of its sovereignty positioning.
- Classified information processing: Roadmap to meet high and very high requirements for handling classified or sensitive information under European regulatory and security regimes; for the German VS-NfD level (Verschlusssache — Nur für den Dienstgebrauch, "Restricted — For Official Use Only"), an authorization to use was granted by the BSI in June 2026.
- Public-sector readiness and EU sovereignty assurance levels: Implemented to meet SEAL-4 (Full Digital Sovereignty) of the European Commission’s Cloud Sovereignty Framework across most sovereignty categories, with SEAL-3 (Digital Resilience) in selected categories.
- Staffing constraints: Operations model selectable to restrict sensitive operations to vetted personnel from EU or NATO countries.

== See also ==
- List of SAP products
- Cloud computing
- Infrastructure as a service
- OpenStack
- Kubernetes
