= Seidor (disambiguation) =

Seidor may refer to:

- Seiðr, a type of magic practiced in the Nordic society.
- Seidor (company), a technology consulting firm with headquarters in Barcelona, Spain.
