= Udo Tschira =

German billionaire heir

- Occupation: heir
- Parent: Klaus Tschira
- Relatives: Harald Tschira (brother)

Udo Tschira is a German billionaire heir.

He is the son of Klaus Tschira, the co-founder of the software company, SAP AG.

Together with his brother Harald Tschira, they inherited their father's wealth on his death in 2015. As of 2021, they are jointly worth $11.3 billion. He owns about 3% of SAP.

He is a director of Fluid Operations AG.
