= Joseph Anton Sambuga =

German Catholic theologian of Italian descent

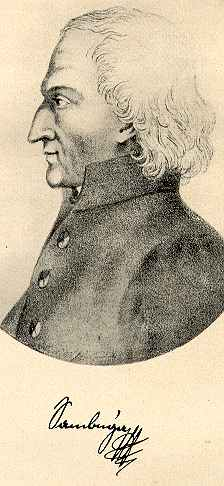
Joseph Anton Sambuga

Joseph Anton Sambuga was a German Catholic theologian of Italian descent. He was a pious, deeply religious priest and belonged to the school of friend Johann Michael Sailer.

== Biography ==
Joseph Anton Sambuga was born at Walldorf near Heidelberg on 9 June 1752. His parents were Italian immigrants who had come from the neighbourhood of Como. He went to school at Mannheim and to the monastic school of the Augustinians at Wiesloch before entering the University of Heidelberg.

In 1770 family affairs took Sambuga to Italy, where he finished his theological studies and was ordained priest at Como on 2 April 1774. After he had served at Como for a while as chaplain at the hospital, he returned to Germany. In 1775 he was appointed as chaplain at Helmsheim, in 1778 as chaplain and in 1783 as court preacher at Mannheim, and in 1785 as parish priest at Herrnsheim. During some of this time he studied music under Francesco Pasquale Ricci. Sambuga was passionate about music, writing in his diaries about a concert he attended by Georg Joseph Vogler.

In 1797, Sambuga was again called to the Court at Mannheim as teacher of religion to Prince Louis (later King Ludwig I of Bavaria), the oldest son of Duke Maximilian Joseph. When Maximilian Joseph went to live at Munich as Elector of Bavaria (from 1806 King Maximilian I), Sambuga followed the Court to that city. He later taught religion also to the younger children of the Elector. He died at Nymphenburg near the Bavarian capital Munich (on 5 June 1815 according to Sailer, but other sources give the date of 5 January.)

== Works ==
Among his writings are noted:

- Schutzrede für den ehelosen Stand der Geistlichen (Frankenthal, 1782; 2nd ed., Munich, 1827)
- Ueber den Philosophismus, welcher unser Zeitalter bedroht (Munich, 1805)
- Ueber die Nothwendigkeit der Besserung, als Rücksprache mit seinem Zeitalter (2 vols., Munich, 1807)
- Untersuchung über das Wesen der Kirche (Linz and Munich, 1809)
- Der Priester am Altare (Munich, 1815; 3d ed., 1819)

Published posthumously were the following:

- Sammlung verschiedener Gedanken über verschiedene Gegenstände, ed. by Franz Stapf (Munich, 1818)
- Auserlesene Briefe, ed. by Karl Klein (Munich, 1818)
- Zweite Sammlung, ed. by Franz Stapf (1819)
- Predigten auf Sonn-und Festtage, ed. by K. Klein (Mannheim, 1822)
- Reden und Aufsätze, collected and ed. by J. B. SchmitterHug (Lindau, 1834)
