= Plateau Systems =

American software company

- Industry: Talent Management
- Founded: 1996
- Headquarters: Arlington, VA, United States
- Key people: Paul Sparta
- Products: Talent Management Suite, iContent
- Number of employees: 350

Plateau Systems is a provider of Talent Management Systems headquartered in Arlington, Virginia, with offices across the United States, Europe, and Asia Pacific. The company provides SaaS products that allow organizations to develop, analyze, and manage organizational talent.

== History ==
Plateau Systems was founded in 1996 by Paul Sparta, chairman and CEO, and Brad Cooper, senior vice president of product strategy; both founders still serve as Plateau executives. Plateau Systems developed one of the industry's first Learning Management Systems (LMS), systems usually used by Human Resources departments for the management and delivery of learning and training across organizations. Plateau's customers include some of the major global organizations and government agencies such as General Electric, Bank of America, the Internal Revenue Service (IRS) and Capital One Services.

In early 2000, Plateau Systems delivered an integrated J2EE-based talent management platform, which allowed organizations to link learning and training with employee performance to measure whether employee goals were aligned with corporate objectives.

In 2007, Plateau acquired Nuvosoft, a provider of web-based compensation management software, and integrated Nuvosoft's functionality into its talent management platform.

On April 26, 2011, it was announced that Plateau would be acquired by SuccessFactors for $145 million in cash plus $145 million in stock.

== See also ==
- Software as a service (SaaS)
- Learning Management
- Performance Management
- Career & Succession Planning
- Content Management
- Business intelligence
