= Klaus Tschira =

German businessman (1940–2015)

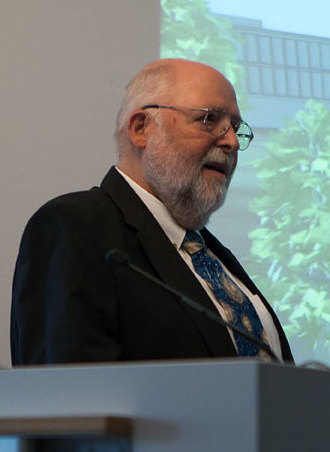
- Tschira in 2015
- Born: 7 December 1940; Freiburg im Breisgau, Germany
- Died: 31 March 2015 (aged 74); Heidelberg, Germany
- Education: University of Karlsruhe
- Occupation: Businessman
- Known for: Co-founder of SAP AG
- Spouse: Married
- Children: Udo Tschira; Harald Tschira

Klaus Tschira (7 December 1940 – 31 March 2015) was a German billionaire entrepreneur and the co-founder of the German software company SAP AG.

== Life ==
After gaining his Diplom in physics and working at IBM, Tschira co-founded the German software giant SAP AG in 1972 in Mannheim, Germany together with Hans-Werner Hector, Dietmar Hopp, Hasso Plattner and Claus Wellenreuther. From 1998 to 2007, he was a board member at SAP. He was married to Gerda Tschira and had two sons, Harald and Udo.

He died on 31 March 2015 in Heidelberg.

== Klaus Tschira Foundation ==
The Klaus Tschira Foundation (KTF) was established by Tschira in 1995 as a non-profit organization. Its primary objective is to support projects in natural and computer sciences as well as mathematics. The KTF places strong emphasis on public understanding in these fields. Tschira's commitment to this objective was honored in 1999 with the "Deutscher Stifterpreis" by the German National Academic Foundation (German: Studienstiftung). The KTF is located at the Villa Bosch in Heidelberg, Germany, the former residence of Nobel Prize laureate for chemistry Carl Bosch (1874–1940).

== Gerda and Klaus Tschira Foundation ==
In 2008, Tschira and his wife Gerda founded the Gerda and Klaus Tschira Foundation.

== Honors ==
- 1995: Honorary doctorate of the University of Klagenfurt
- 1997: Honorary senator of the University of Heidelberg
- 1999: Order of Merit of the Federal Republic of Germany (Verdienstkreuz am Bande)
- 1999: Honorary senator of the Karlsruhe Institute of Technology (KIT)
- 1999: Deutscher Stifterpreis by the German National Academic Foundation
- 2000: Naming the asteroid 13028 Klaustschira by the International Astronomical Union IAU for supporting the miniaturized satellite DIVA
- 2003: Fellow of the Gesellschaft für Informatik
- 2007: Konrad-Zuse-Badge
- 2007: Rudolf-Diesel-Medaille by the German Institute for Inventions
- 2008: Alwin-Walther-Medal
- 2008: Honorary senator of the Heidelberg College of Education
- 2009: Order of Merit of the Federal Republic of Germany (Verdienstkreuz 1. Klasse)
- 2010: Honorary doctorate of Karlsruhe Institute of Technology (KIT)
- 2010: Leibniz-Medal by the Berlin-Brandenburg Academy of Sciences and Humanities
- 2011: Honorary member of the Astronomische Gesellschaft
- Honorary senator of the University of Mannheim

== See also ==
- List of billionaires
