= Mannheim University Library =

Library of the University of Mannheim

- Universitätsbibliothek Mannheim

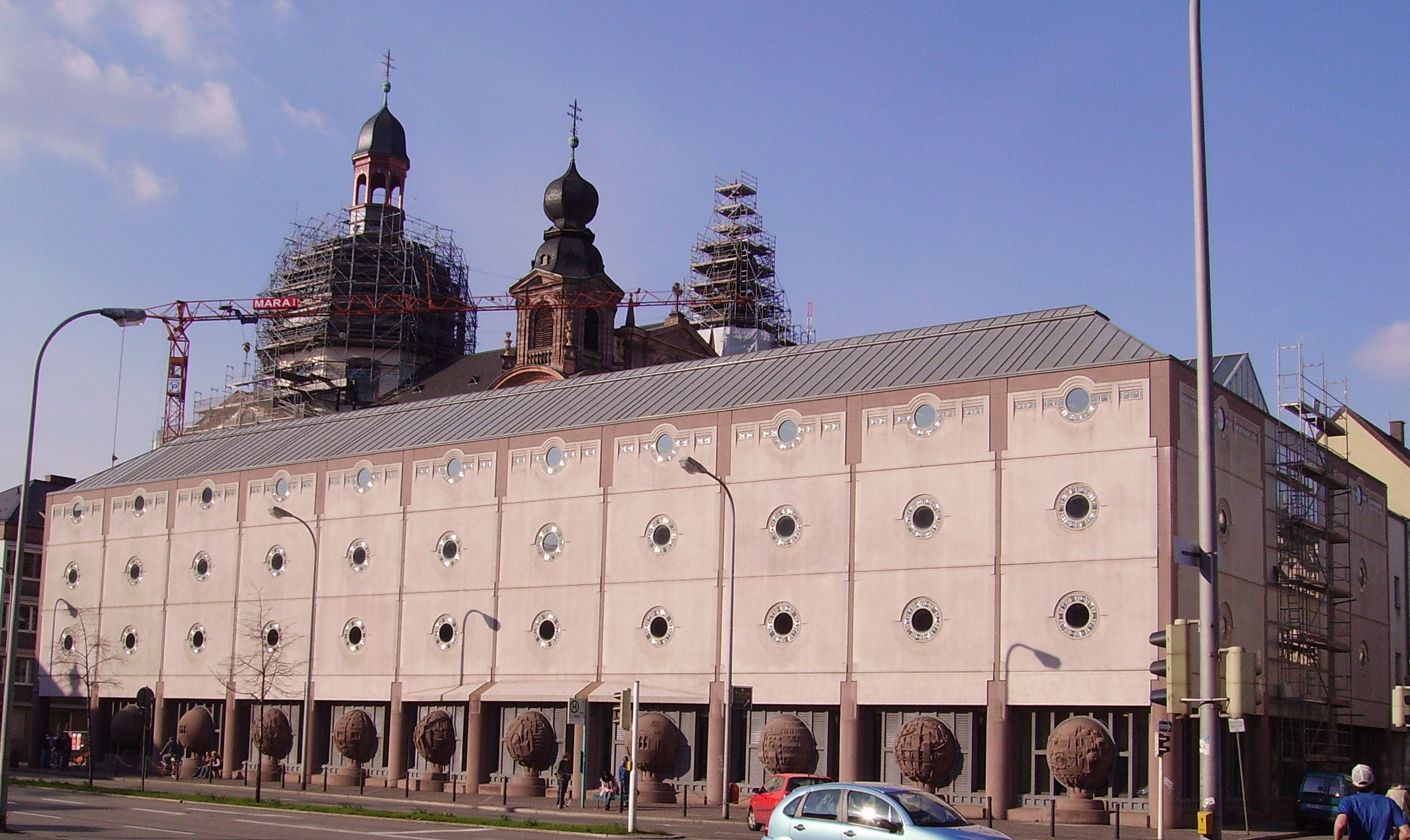
- 49°28′59″N 8°27′49″E
- Location: Mannheim, Germany
- Established: 1967

Collection
- Items collected: Books; journals; newspapers; magazines; manuscripts; psychological tests
- Size: 2,700,000

Access and use
- Population served: Members of the university, general public

Other information
- Website: www.bib.uni-mannheim.de

The Mannheim University Library (German: Universitätsbibliothek Mannheim) is the library of the University of Mannheim.

The library provides books and information resources for researchers, instructors, students and further education at university. It is also open to residents, agencies and businesses in the Mannheim area.

== History ==
Mannheim's library system's origins date back to the early 20th century when Mannheim's City College of Trade (Städtische Handelshochschule) was founded in 1907, it maintained a large central library which was supplemented by various departmental libraries. In 1932 these libraries were merged with the Municipal Palace Library (Städtische Schlossbücherei), which later became the Municipal Science Library Mannheim (Wissenschaftliche Stadtbibliothek Mannheim).

When the National Socialists came to power in 1933, the College of Trade was dissolved and the books in its library were donated to the University of Heidelberg. In 1946 the bulk of the collection was returned when the "Staatliche Wirtschaftshochschule Mannheim" (State College of Business Mannheim) was founded. When the business college became a university in 1967, the library acquired new and much expanded collections in all the subjects taught at the university. It also inherited around 240,000 volumes of older books from the "Wissenschaftliche Stadtbibliothek Mannheim" (Scientific Municipal Library Mannheim), which was dissolved in 1970. Today, the University Library of Mannheim maintains four libraries with more than 2.2 million volumes. The conventional book supply is complemented by numerous electronic services, such as 30,000 scientific journals, 600 scientific databases and more than 47,000 e-books that can be accessed via e-journal. It is one of Germany's most frequently used library systems and in the German library rankings of 2012, it was placed among the 5 best libraries in Germany.

== Library Sections ==
The library is organized centrally without any decentralized libraries, but there are different library sections, which are located at the Mannheim Palace and the city squares A3, A5:

- Schloss Schneckenhof Library: special reading area, InfoCenter, Learning Center (group work rooms and quiet reading room), business studies
- Schloss Ehrenhof (Hasso-Plattner) Library: law, economics, history and economic geography. The library was built in 2006 The library's construction was primarily funded by a donation of Euro 10 million by the SAP co-founder Hasso Plattner in 2005.
- A3 Library: English, German, Romance and Slavic languages and literatures, classical philology, media and communication studies, psychology, education sciences and theology
- A5 Library: mathematics, information technology and the social sciences, European Documentation Center
- Schloss Westflügel Library: Central lending library and textbook collection
