= Walldorf =

- Town
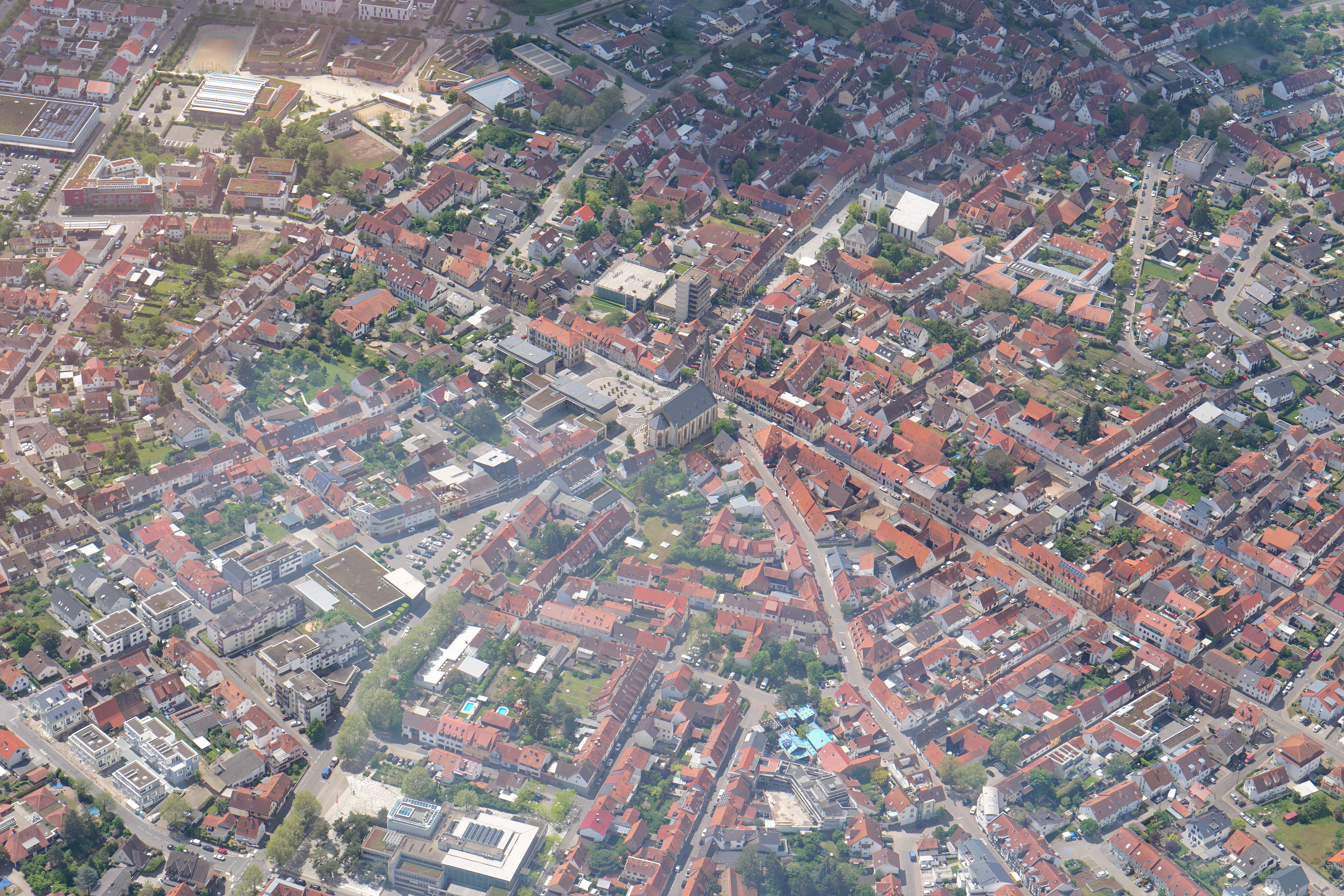
- Walldorf from above

- Coat of arms

- Location of Walldorf within Rhein-Neckar-Kreis district
- Interactive map of Walldorf
- Location within Germany Location within Baden-Württemberg
- Coordinates: 49°18′N 08°39′E
- Country: Germany
- State: Baden-Württemberg
- Admin. region: Karlsruhe
- District: Rhein-Neckar-Kreis

Government
  - Mayor (2021–29): Matthias Renschler (FDP)

Area
  - Total: 19.91 km^{2} (7.69 sq mi)
- Elevation: 110 m (360 ft)

Population (2025-12-31)
  - Total: 16,219
  - Density: 814.6/km^{2} (2,110/sq mi)
- Time zone: UTC+01:00 (CET)
  - Summer (DST): UTC+02:00 (CEST)
- Postal codes: 69190
- Dialling codes: 06227
- Vehicle registration: HD
- Website: www.walldorf.de

Walldorf (German pronunciation: [ˈvalˌdɔʁf]; South Franconian: Walldoaf) is a town in the Rhein-Neckar-Kreis district in the state of Baden-Württemberg in Germany.

In the eighteenth century, Walldorf was the birthplace of John Jacob Astor, who emigrated and became a prominent fur trader in the newly independent United States, establishing a monopoly in North America. Concentrating on real estate acquisition and investment, and based in New York City, he grew even wealthier and was the patriarch of the wealthy and influential Astor family.

Walldorf is home to the world's fifth largest software company, SAP. It is also famous for its motorway interchange for the A5 and A6 highway.

== Geography ==
The neighbouring town to the southeast is Wiesloch. The towns are strongly linked economically. Adjacent municipalities are Sandhausen, Leimen, Nußloch, St. Leon-Rot and Reilingen. The train station, named Wiesloch-Walldorf, is located between the two towns.

== History ==
Hallstatt-culture barrows are preserved in the Hochholz woods, near the offices of SAP Deutschland. The earliest documentary mention of the settlement occurs as Waltorf in a 770 deed issued by the Abbey of Lorsch. The Electorate of the Palatinate received Walldorf as an Imperial fief in 1230. The town suffered much during the Thirty Years' War of 1618–1648, and in 1689 was completely destroyed in the course of the French invasion during Nine Years' War. The area was settled anew by religious refugees, among them the predecessors of John Jacob Astor, Waldensians from Piedmont.

During the German Mediatisation, Walldorf fell to Baden. In 1843 the Rheintalbahn was built: this railway decisively promoted economic development. In 1901 Grand Duke Frederick I of Baden granted Walldorf town privileges. After World War II the companies Heidelberger Druckmaschinen (founded 1850) and SAP (founded 1972; moved to Walldorf in 1977) were established in Walldorf.

== Politics ==
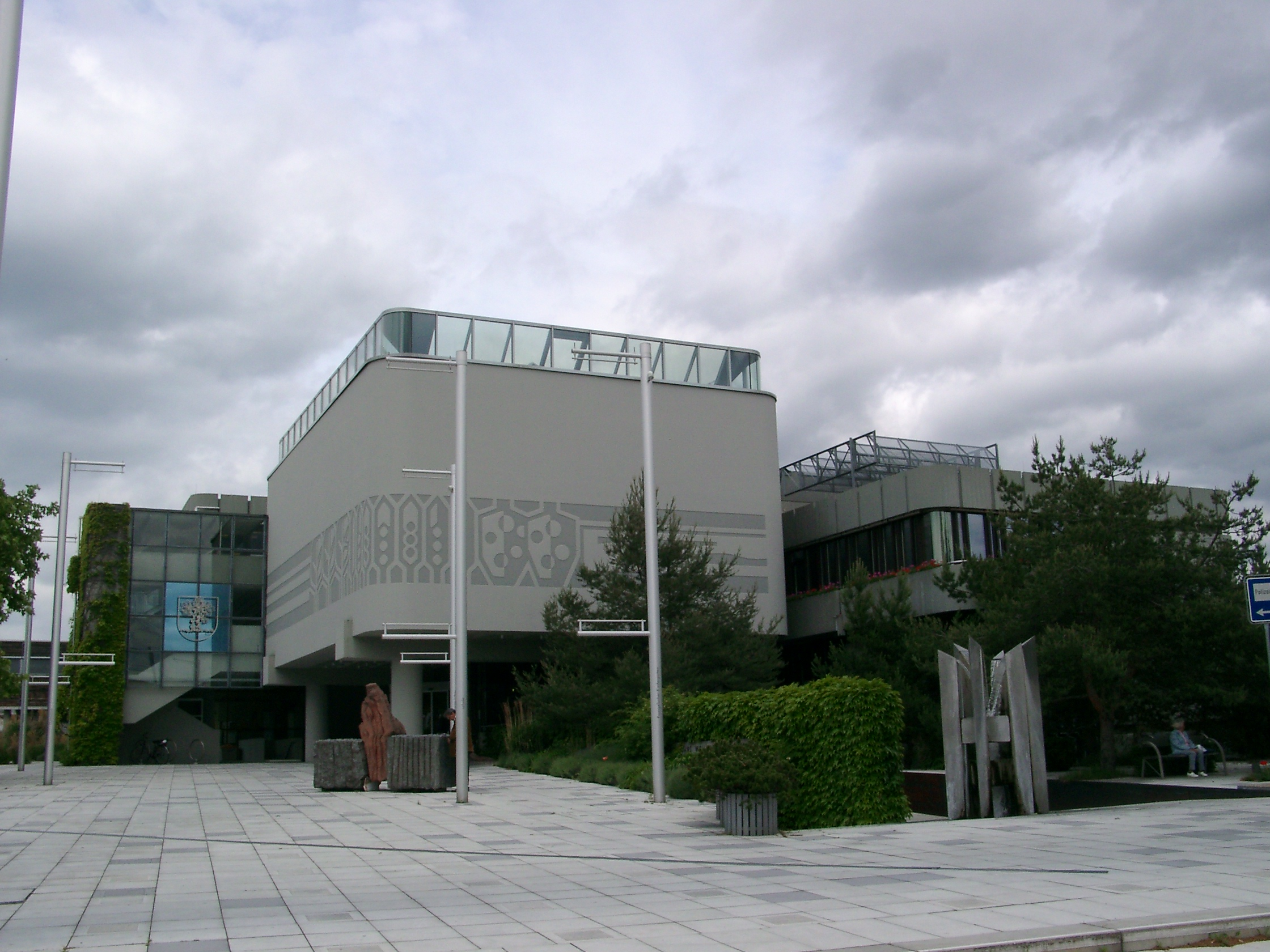
Town hall

Seats in the municipal assembly (Gemeinderat) as of 2024 elections:

- CDU (Christian Democratic Union): 7 (31,61%)
- SPD (Social Democratic Party of Germany): 5 (22,70%)
- FDP (Free Democratic Party): 5 (21,98%)
- Grüne (Alliance '90/The Greens): 4 (18,79%)
- Zusammen für Walldorf (Together for Walldorf): 1 (4,91%)

== Economy ==
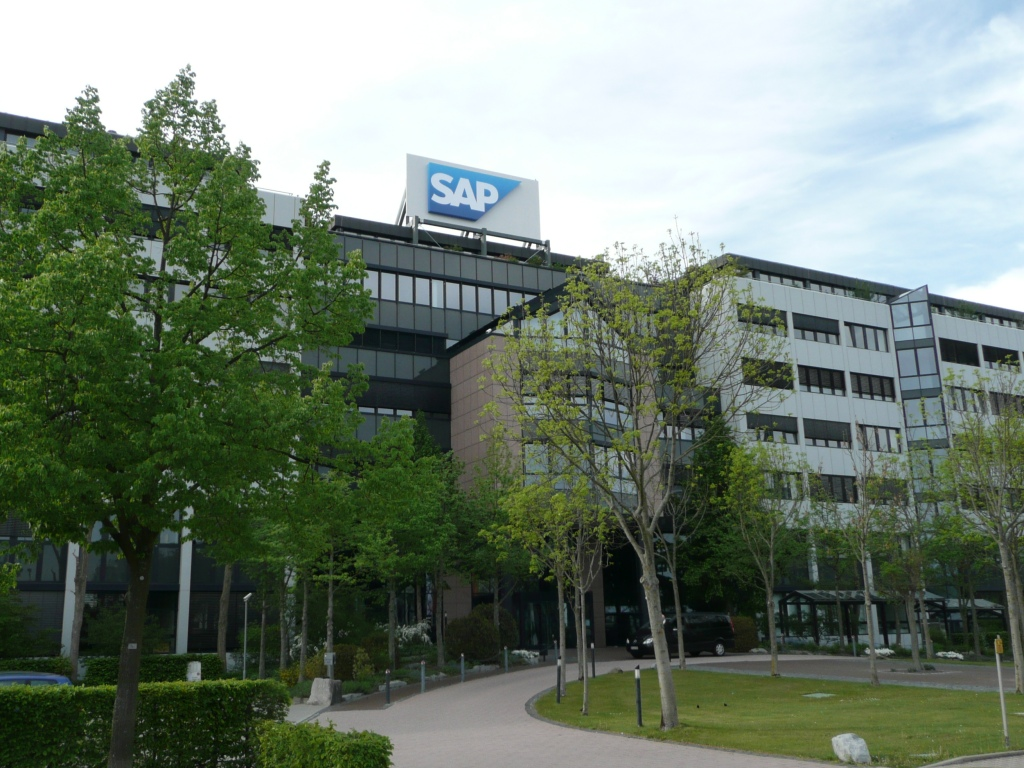
SAP SE head office

SAP SE has had its headquarters in the city since 1977. It is Europe's most valuable brand, as well as the largest non-American software enterprise by revenue.

== Twin cities ==
- Astoria, Oregon, United States, since 1963
- Kırklareli, Turkey, since 1970
- Saint-Max, France, since 1985
- Waldorf, Maryland, United States, since 2002
- Freeport, New York, United States, since 2003

== Sights ==
The Astorhaus was built in 1854, from a pecuniary legacy of the deceased John Jacob Astor to his hometown. For decades, it served as an almshouse, and now hosts the register office and a museum.

The 19th-century synagogue was devastated in the 1938 Kristallnacht attacks and most of the congregation was killed in the Holocaust. The building is now used as a New Apostolic Church.

Walldorf is known for cultivating white asparagus, which is available in the months of April through June.

== Representation in other media ==
- British writer John Le Carré refers to the town, without naming it, in his novel Absolute Friends (2003), which is primarily set in Heidelberg.

== Notable people ==
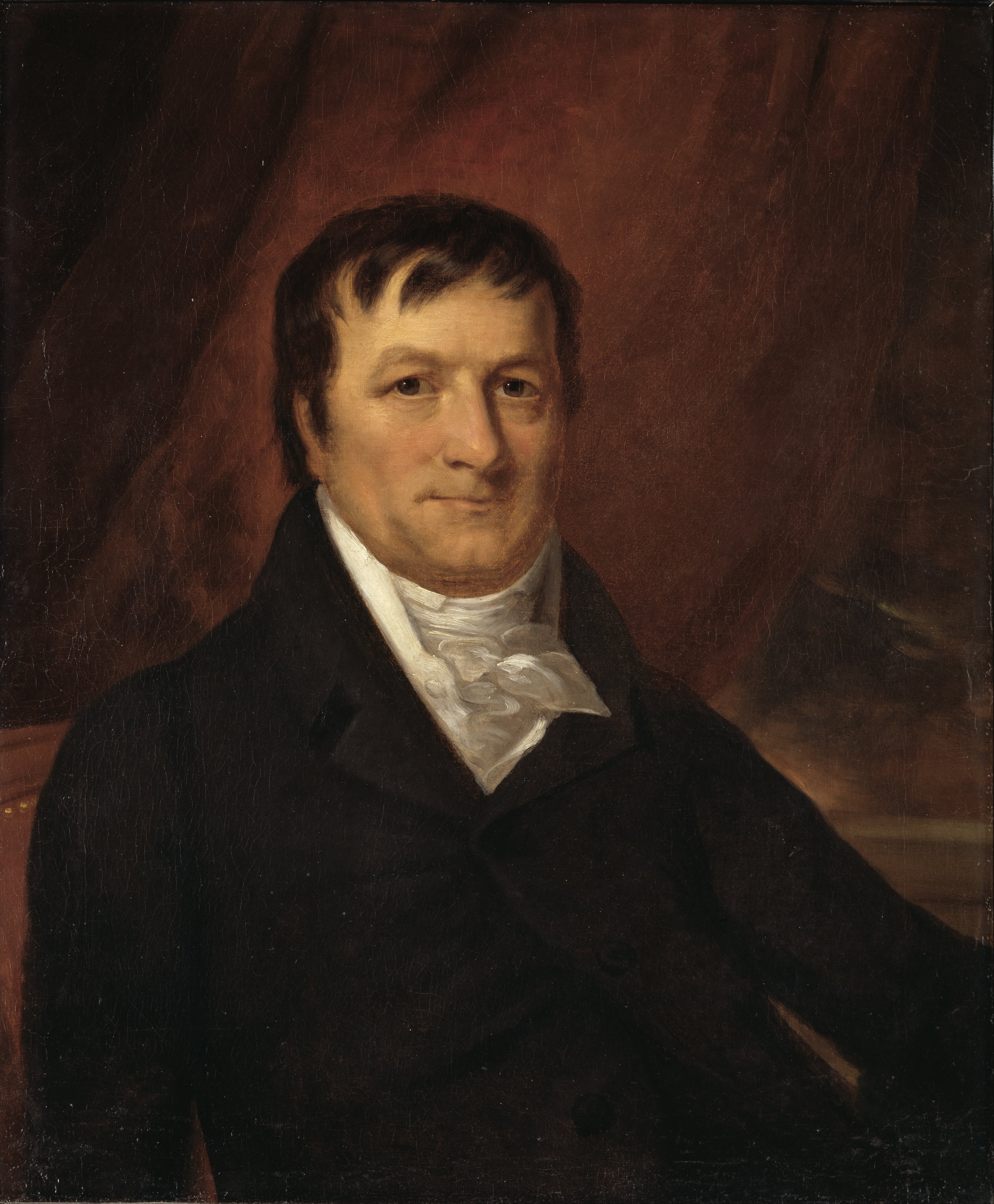
John Jacob Astor, 1825

- Joseph Anton Sambuga (1752-1815), German Catholic theologian of Italian descent.
- John Jacob Astor (1763–1848), entrepreneur, emigrated as a young man to the United States, where he made a fortune in fur trading and real estate acquisition; he was the wealthiest man in the nation at his death.
- Leopold Rügheimer (1850–1917) a notable German chemist, invented the Staedel-Rugheimer pyrazine synthesis
- Dietmar Hopp (born 1940), billionaire software entrepreneur, grew up nearby.
- Timo Jouko Herrmann (born 1978) a German composer, musicologist and conductor.
