= Hasso Plattner Foundation =

Charitable foundation for the sciences

The Hasso Plattner Foundation is a charitable foundation established in 2015 by Hasso Plattner. It is active in the fields of science, education, social issues, nature conservation, art, and culture. It is based in Potsdam, Germany.

== History ==
Even before establishing the Foundation, Hasso Plattner was involved in a wide range of philanthropic activities. In 1998, he founded the Hasso Plattner Institute in Potsdam.

This was expanded in 2007 with the addition of the HPI School of Design Thinking, modeled on the Hasso Plattner Institute of Design at Stanford University in Palo Alto. The decisive moment in establishing his own foundation was the Giving Pledge initiative. Plattner joined this initiative in 2013. In 2015, the Hasso Plattner Foundation was established and has since grown into an ecosystem of multiple projects across several countries.

== Foundation bodies ==
The Foundation is steered by two bodies: the Foundation Council and the executive board. The Foundation Council advises and supervises the executive board, approves the annual budget, and oversees the Foundation's strategy. The executive board is responsible for executing the Foundation's strategy. The founder serves as a strategic advisor to the Foundation.

== Areas of activity ==
=== Science and education ===
As part of the Hasso Plattner Foundation, the Hasso Plattner Institute (HPI) operates the joint faculty of Digital Engineering at the University of Potsdam.

Since 2017, the HPI Digital Health Cluster has been working as a research network in the field of health and human sciences in conjunction with data sciences, digital technology, and society. The aim “is to utilize and continually develop digital technologies in the fields of medicine, healthcare, and public health in order to improve the health and well-being of each individual as well as larger communities.” Since March 2019, the Hasso Plattner Institute for Digital Health at Mount Sinai (HPI-MS) has been collaborating closely with researchers at Mount Sinai Hospital (New York) in the field of medicine. Founded in 2018, the Data4Life project is dedicated to digital health research and has offices in Potsdam, Berlin, and Singapore.

=== Social and conservation ===
Sabine Plattner African Charities (SPAC) has been active since 2008. It is committed to nature conservation in Africa, particularly in the Odzala-Kokoua National Park in the Republic of Congo. At the heart of its activities is educational work, for which teachers and researchers are key. A holistic preschool education is also offered in the area of early childhood development. In six African countries, the SPAC EduConservation program aims to raise awareness of environmental protection through training courses and educational materials for teachers.

Founded in 2016, the Embark in Knowledge project is active in youth work in the Republic of South Africa. In 2018, the Inkcubeko Youth and Science Center was founded in Thembalethu (George Local Municipality) and offers youth programs in the fields of science, education, and health. The Hasso Plattner Foundation also supports the child protection organization George Child & Family Welfare (GCFW), founded in 1926. This organization is dedicated to social work with children in need of care and their families.

=== Art and culture ===
The Hasso Plattner Foundation supports the Museum Barberini and Das Minsk Kunsthaus in Potsdam through the Museen der Hasso Plattner Foundation gGmbH. The Museum Barberini was built in the externally reconstructed Palais Barberini by the Hasso Plattner Foundation. The Museum opened in 2017 and hosts two to three special exhibitions each year. Since 2020, it has been home to works of Impressionism and Post-Impressionism from the Hasso Plattner Collection. The exhibitions are accompanied by academic conferences. The Museum Barberini also offers various digital services and educational programs.

Das Minsk Kunsthaus in Potsdam is in a building originally constructed as a restaurant in the 1970s. After years of being vacant and undergoing renovation, it has been repurposed as a museum since autumn 2022. In addition to displaying works by artists from the GDR from the Plattner Collection, the museum also hosts exhibitions of modern and contemporary art.

Founded in New York in 2017, the Wildenstein Plattner Institute (WPI) emerged from the Wildenstein Institute, originally founded in Paris in 1970. The WPI has published catalogues raisonnés on several artists and has an extensive archive in this field. Since its reestablishment, the WPI has been working primarily on the digitalization of catalogues raisonnés and further publications.
