= Dietmar Hopp =

German billionaire businessman

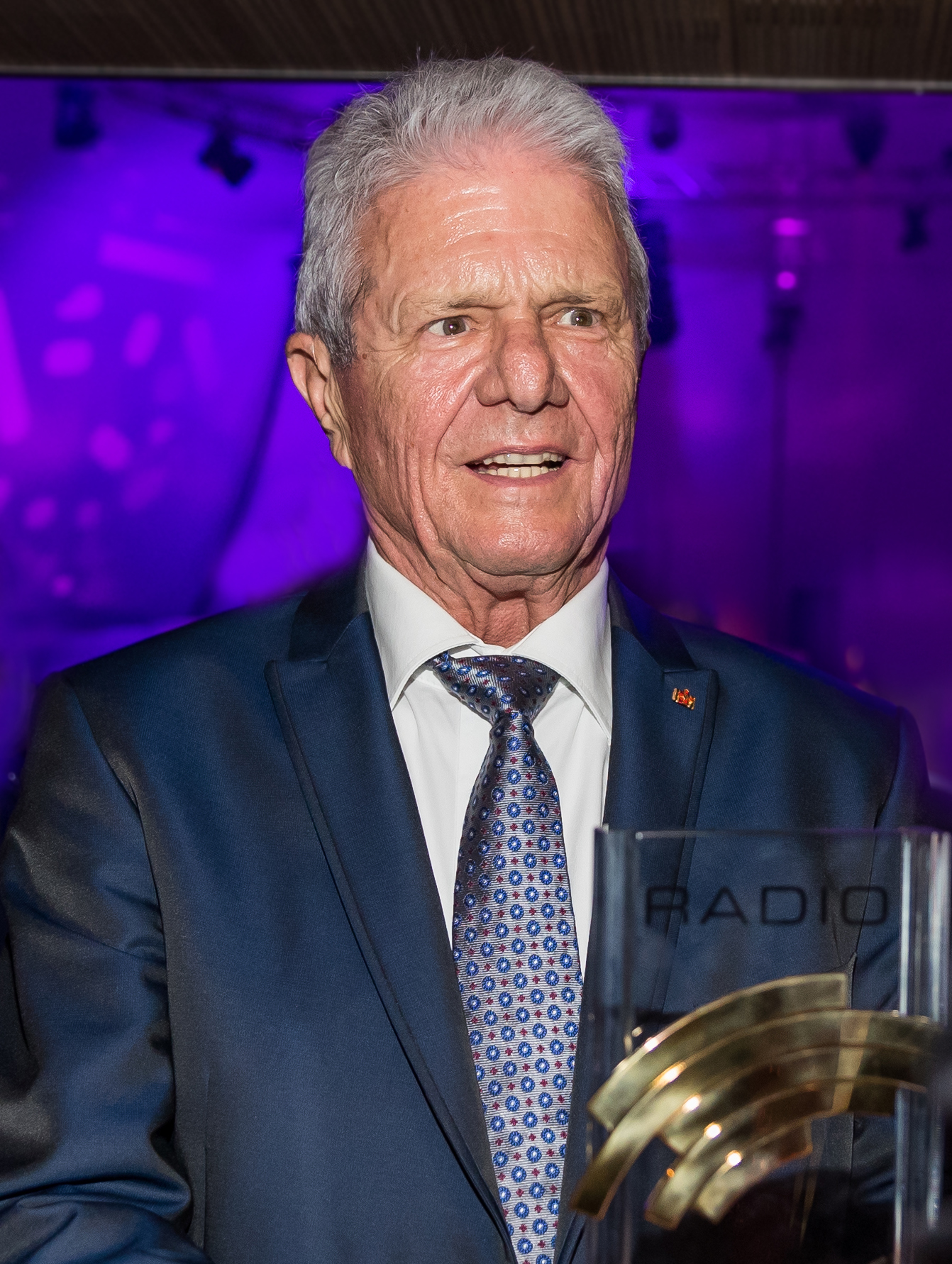
- Hopp in 2019
- Born: 26 April 1940 (age 86); Heidelberg, Nazi Germany
- Occupation: Businessman
- Known for: Co-founder of SAP SE; Owner of TSG Hoffenheim and Académico de Viseu
- Spouse: Anneliese Zeuner
- Children: 2 sons

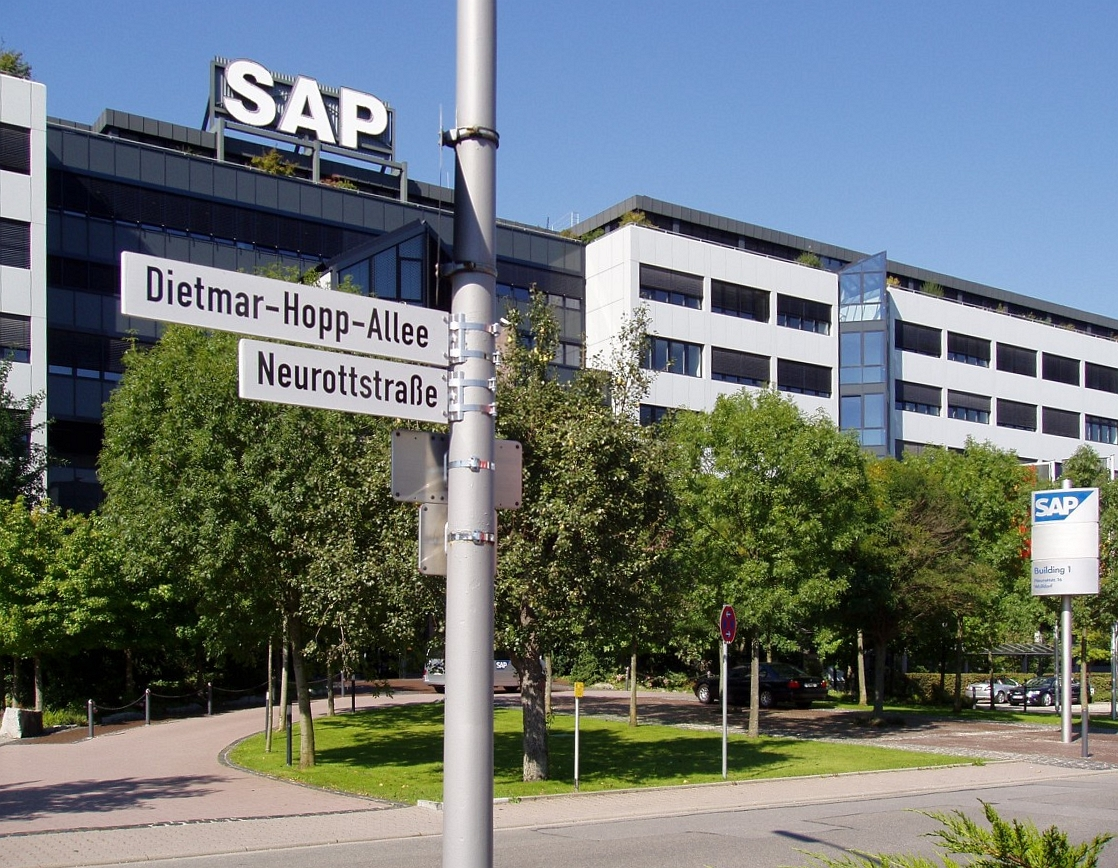
SAP SE headquarters

Dietmar Hopp (German pronunciation: [ˈdiːtmaʁ ˈhɔp]; born 26 April 1940) is a German software engineer and billionaire businessman. He was one of the founders of SAP SE in 1972 with other former IBM employees Hans Werner Hector, Klaus Tschira, Claus Wellenreuther and Hasso Plattner. Hopp is the owner of German Bundesliga club TSG Hoffenheim and Portuguese Primeira Liga club Académico de Viseu.

In September 2021, Forbes estimated his net worth at US$8.3 billion.

== Early life and business career ==
Hopp grew up in Hoffenheim, a small village in Baden-Württemberg, Southern Germany. His father, Emil Hopp, was a Truppführer of the Nazi Party paramilitary organization Sturmabteilung, and led as a commanding officer the destruction of a synagogue in Hoffenheim during the Kristallnacht pogrom in November 1938.

In 2009, the Nazi past of his father was publicly addressed for the first time when Menachem Mayer and Fred Raymes, two Jewish brothers who had been persecuted as children and forced into exile, revealed in their memoirs the role Hopps father had played in the destruction of their hometown’s synagogue. Dietmar Hopp supported a film project about their lives.

After graduating from high school with an Abitur, he studied telecommunications engineering in Karlsruhe until 1966. After graduating from university, he worked as a software developer and consultant at IBM.

In 1972, he founded SAP SE with four other former IBM colleagues Hans Werner Hector, Klaus Tschira, Claus Wellenreuther and Hasso Plattner. He remained CEO of SAP SE (then SAP AG) from 1988 until 1998, chairman of its supervisory board from 1998 until 2003 and member of the board from 2003 until 2005. He kept about 10% of the company's shares after leaving the board.

He continues investing into various minor companies and his Dietmar-Hopp-Stiftung, a philanthropic foundation, has spent hundreds of millions of Euros for medicine, education and other charity in the Rhine-Neckar metropolitan region.

== TSG Hoffenheim ==
Hopp is the chief financial backer of the German football club TSG Hoffenheim, a club located close to his childhood home and which he played for as a teenager.

After suffering a devastating loss in 1990, Hopp decided to invest money into his former club, which was playing in the lowest tiers of the German football league system (Kreisliga) at that time. Due to his financial aid, the club became a major force in the region by the early 2000s, reaching Germany's third division (Regionalliga). In 2005, Hopp massively intensified his investments and aimed for the promotion to the Bundesliga, Germany's top division. Hopp spent large amounts of money on new players and coach Ralf Rangnick and Hoffenheim managed two consecutive promotions and eventually entered the Bundesliga in 2008, which it has played in since then.

Hopp also spent €100 million to build a new 30,000-seat stadium, the Rhein-Neckar-Arena near Sinsheim, for the club.

Altogether, it is estimated that Hopp has invested more than €350 million into the club.

Hopp and his influence on the club has been criticised. The club has been labeled as a plastic club, as its success is largely based on Hopp's financial aid. Hopp has been verbally attacked by other fans multiple times, leading to several arrests and fines.

== Personal life ==
Hopp is married to Anneliese Zeuner, they have two sons, and live in Walldorf, Germany. His son Daniel Hopp (born Oct 1980) is the managing director of the event venue SAP Arena in Mannheim, the ice hockey team Adler Mannheim, the golf club St. Leon Rot as well as the Dietmar-Hopp-Foundation. His son Oliver Hopp (born Apr 1972) heads the golf resort Domaine de Terre Blanche in southern France.
