= Claus Wellenreuther =

German businessman (1935–2026)

- Born: 11 March 1935; Mannheim, Nazi Germany
- Died: 21 March 2026 (aged 91)
- Education: University of Mannheim
- Known for: Co-founder of SAP SE

Claus Wellenreuther (11 March 1935 – 21 March 2026) was a German businessman and the co-founder of the software company SAP SE.

== Life and career ==
Wellenreuther was born in Mannheim and studied business administration at University of Mannheim with a specialization in operations research.

He submitted his dissertation on Markov processes and their implementation on queueing systems in 1968. Afterwards, Wellenreuther worked at IBM in Mannheim, where he was responsible for developing financial accountancy systems. In 1971, he left IBM to program a standard financial accountancy system with batch processing. He then joined his former IBM colleagues Hasso Plattner, Dietmar Hopp, Hans-Werner Hector and Klaus Tschira to found the software company Systeme, Anwendungen und Produkte in der Datenverarbeitung in Weinheim, which would later become the SAP AG. Wellenreuther was primarily responsible for the architecture and the concept of the SAP R/2 financial accountancy module.

Wellenreuther left the business in 1980 for health reasons and received a compensation of 1 million DM.

In 1982, he founded DCW Software (Dr. Claus Wellenreuther GmbH & Co. KG), which he developed into a specialist for middle-sized ERP software. The company was acquired by SAP in 2003. The "deal among friends" was heavily criticized by DCW customers that had explicitly decided for an alternative to SAP. In 2004, DCW was merged with the SAP subsidiary Steeb Anwendungssysteme GmbH.

Wellenreuther died on 21 March 2026, at the age of 91.
