= Jennifer Morgan =

American technology executive (born 1971)

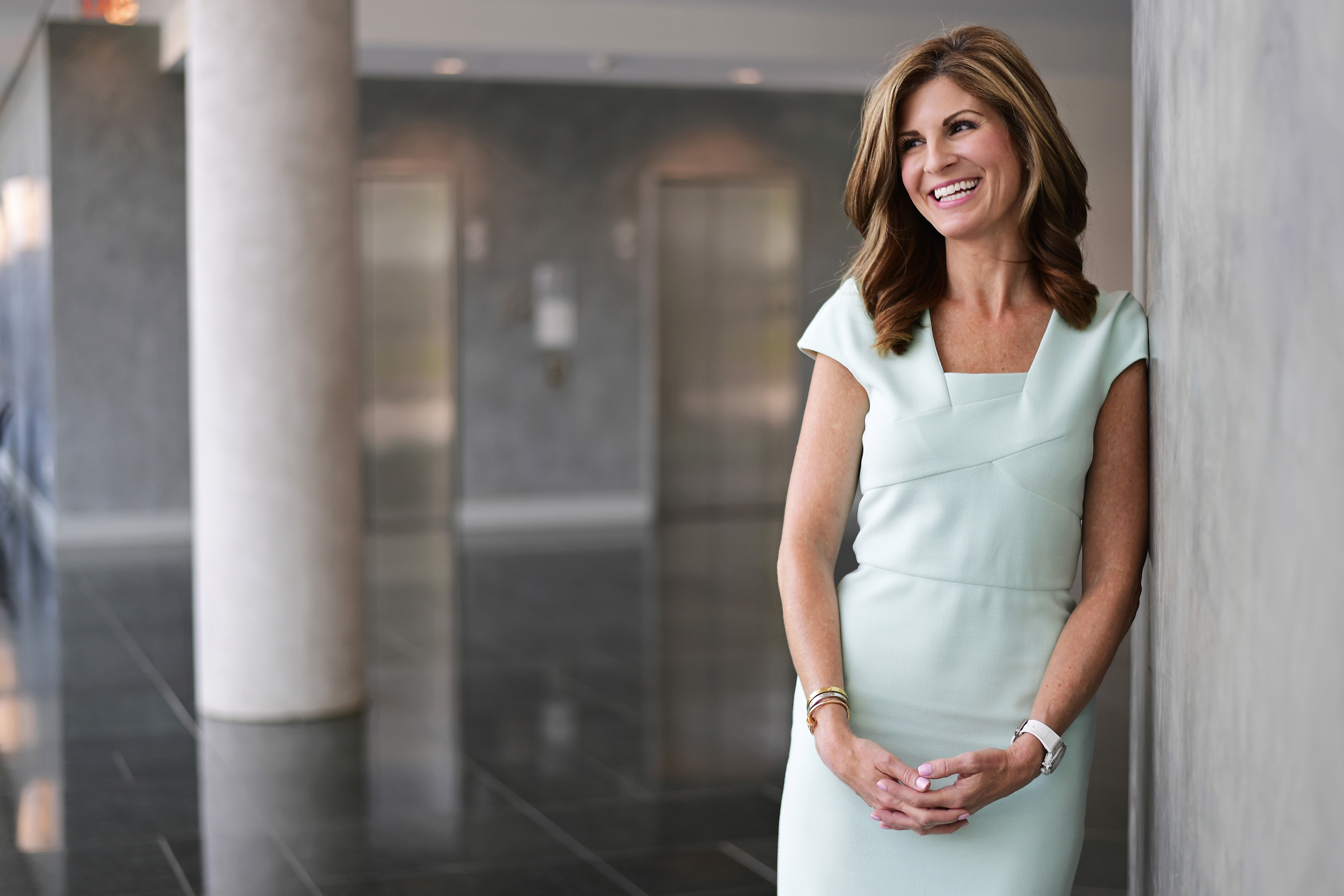
- Born: Jennifer Bilodeau; March 13, 1971 (age 55); Fairfax, Virginia, U.S.
- Education: James Madison University (BA)
- Spouse: Michael Morgan
- Children: 2

Jennifer Morgan (born March 13, 1971) is an American technology executive. She is currently CEO at UKG. Prior to her appointment in July 2024, Morgan was the first American woman ever appointed to the SAP Executive Board in 2017. Morgan was the first female Chief Executive of SAP, and she was the first female CEO of a company on the DAX index.

Morgan grew up in Fairfax, Northern Virginia, with her mother and father.[2] She attended James Madison University.[5] After graduating, Morgan began working at AXA Consulting (now Accenture), where she met her husband, Michael Morgan.[2]

== Career ==
Following her graduation from James Madison, Morgan began work at Andersen Consulting (now Accenture). After Andersen Consulting, Morgan served in a business development role at Siebel Systems (2000–2004).

Morgan joined SAP in 2004 as part of the company's public sector business. From there, Morgan rose quickly within SAP leadership. In just five years, Morgan went from President of SAP Regulated Industries to the President of the Americas & Asia Pacific Japan. In 2017, Morgan was appointed to the SAP executive board and in April 2019 she became President of the SAP Cloud Business Group. In October 2019, Morgan and fellow SAP Executive Board member Christian Klein were named Co-Chief Executive Officers of SAP following the departure of CEO Bill McDermott.

Beginning in 2015, while she was President of SAP North America, Morgan led efforts to close the gender pay gap at SAP. After independent audits of Morgan's initiative, SAP raised salaries by over $1 million across the company, which resulted in 99% of all men and women being paid equally.

In January 2019, Morgan launched her podcast, A Call to Lead. The podcast targets mid-career professionals and discusses leadership and career advancement. Morgan's podcast guests have included academics, business professionals, and government officials (including First Lady Jill Biden, Simon Sinek, and others).

On April 30, 2020, Morgan stepped down from her position as co-CEO citing a mutual decision with the company board.

In November 2020, Blackstone Group announced that Morgan joined the firm as its first Global Head of Portfolio Transformation and Talent.

In July 2024, UKG announced Morgan had succeeded Chris Todd as CEO.

== Recognition ==
In 2019, Fortune named Morgan ranked 43rd on Fortune Magazine's list of the 50 Most Powerful Women in Business.

In 2019, Morgan was ranked 49th on Forbes' list of Most Powerful Women in the World. Morgan was ranked 55th on Forbes’ list of Most Powerful Women in the World for 2018.

In 2017, the New York Hall of Science honored Morgan with the Distinguished Leadership Award.

== Personal life ==
Morgan met her husband, Michael, during her work at Andersen Consulting.
