= SAP SuccessFactors =

Software product

SuccessFactors Inc.
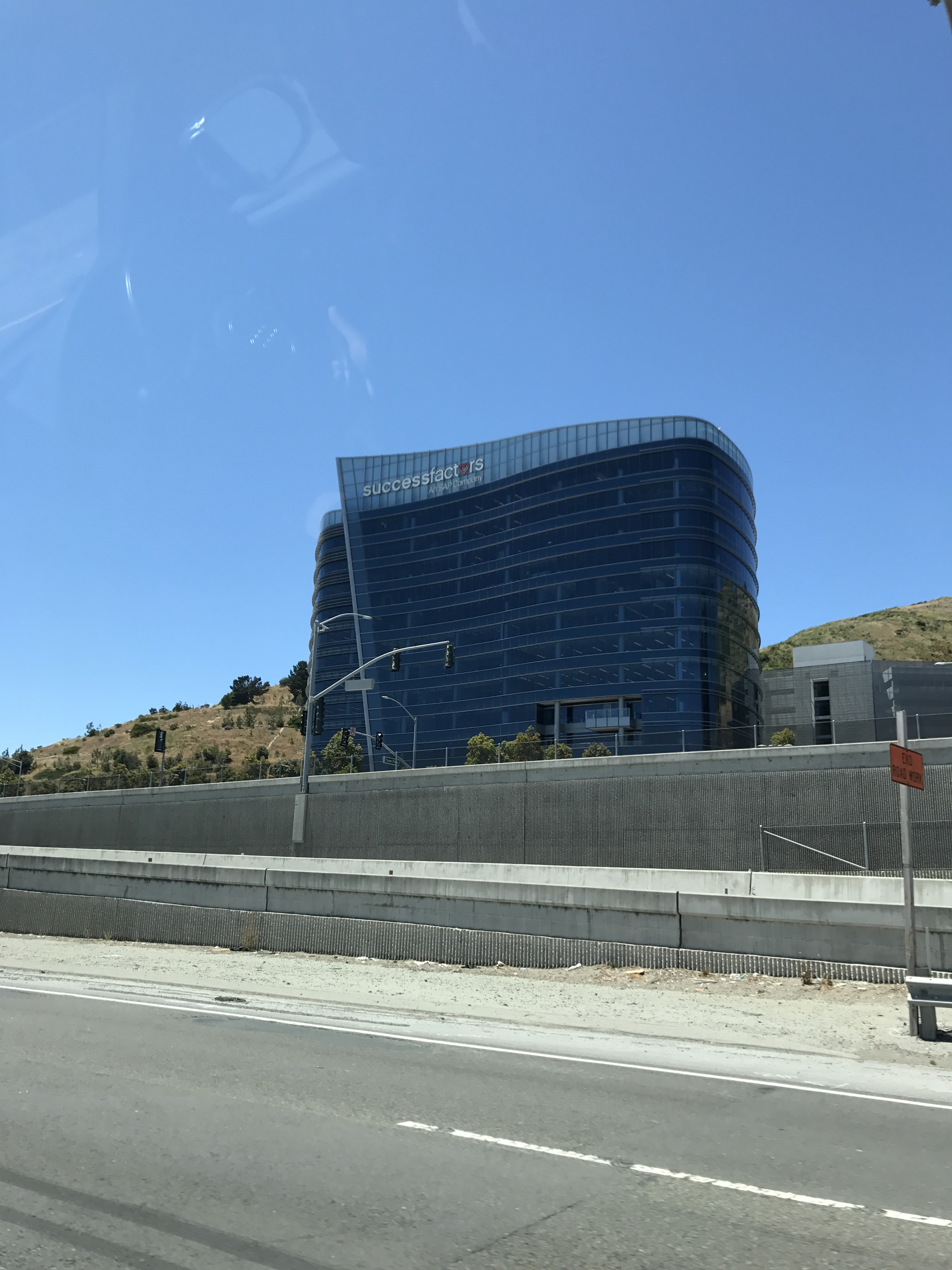
- Type: Subsidiary
- Industry: Computer software
- Founded: 2001; 25 years ago, in California
- Founder: Lars Dalgaard, Aaron Au
- Headquarters: South San Francisco, California, U.S.
- Area served: Worldwide
- Number of employees: 1,447 (2011)
- Parent: SAP SE
- Website: www.sap.com/products/human-resources-hcm.html

SAP SuccessFactors is an American multinational company headquartered in South San Francisco, California, providing cloud-based software for human capital management using the software as a service (SaaS) model and subsidiary of German multinational software company SAP.

== History ==
The company was founded in 2001 by Lars Dalgaard. In November 2007, the company went public on the NASDAQ Global Market under the stock symbol SFSF. In July 2008, SuccessFactors moved its listing to the NYSE, NYSE Euronext, and the Frankfurt Stock Exchange (Deutsche Boerse).

== Merger and acquisitions ==
=== Acquisitions ===
- Infohrm – In February, 2010, the firm acquired Infohrm, an Australian-based HR analytics business.
- Cubetree – May, 2010 – it acquired CubeTree – social software.
- Jambok – March, 2011 – it acquired Jambok, a small platform company with a solution for social learning and knowledge sharing.
- YouCalc – On October 17, 2010, it announced its acquisition of this Denmark-based SaaS service. On October 18, 2010, SuccessFactors launched the first Calculator in the Cloud technology, allowing business users to do analysis of real-time data for insight and predictions.
- Plateau – The firm announced the acquisition of Plateau on April 26, 2011, developer of one of the first Learning Management Systems (LMS).
- Jobs2Web, Inc – On December 6, 2011, the firm announced the purchase of closely held Jobs2Web Inc. for $110 million in cash.
- SmartRecruiters, Inc - On September 11, 2025, the firm announced the acquisition of venture backed Applicant Tracking System provider SmartRecruiters. The terms of the deal were not disclosed

=== Merger ===
On December 3, 2011, SAP and SuccessFactors announced that SAP's subsidiary, SAP America, Inc., had entered into a merger agreement with SuccessFactors to acquire all outstanding shares of its common stock. It was also announced that the firm would remain independent and be named "SuccessFactors, an SAP company", with a prerogative to make its own deals until the acquisition closed.

The acquisition was completed on February 16, 2012. SAP and SuccessFactors have evolved a great deal over the past several years and they now have a new name and logo to share. Instead of “SuccessFactors, an SAP Company”, the company is now officially being called SAP SuccessFactors.

== Products ==
In October 2013, the firm opened up its platform as part of the SAP Cloud Platform. Applications such as Accenture Audit & Compliance Tool and EnterpriseAlumni were showcased during the 2014 Annual SAP Conference, SAPPHIRE, both becoming SAP Pinnacle finalists as Application Development Partners Of The Year.

In January 2022, SAP claimed SuccessFactors had 12,000 customers, with 191 million users in more than 200 countries.
