= Seidor (company) =

Technology consulting firm

SEIDOR
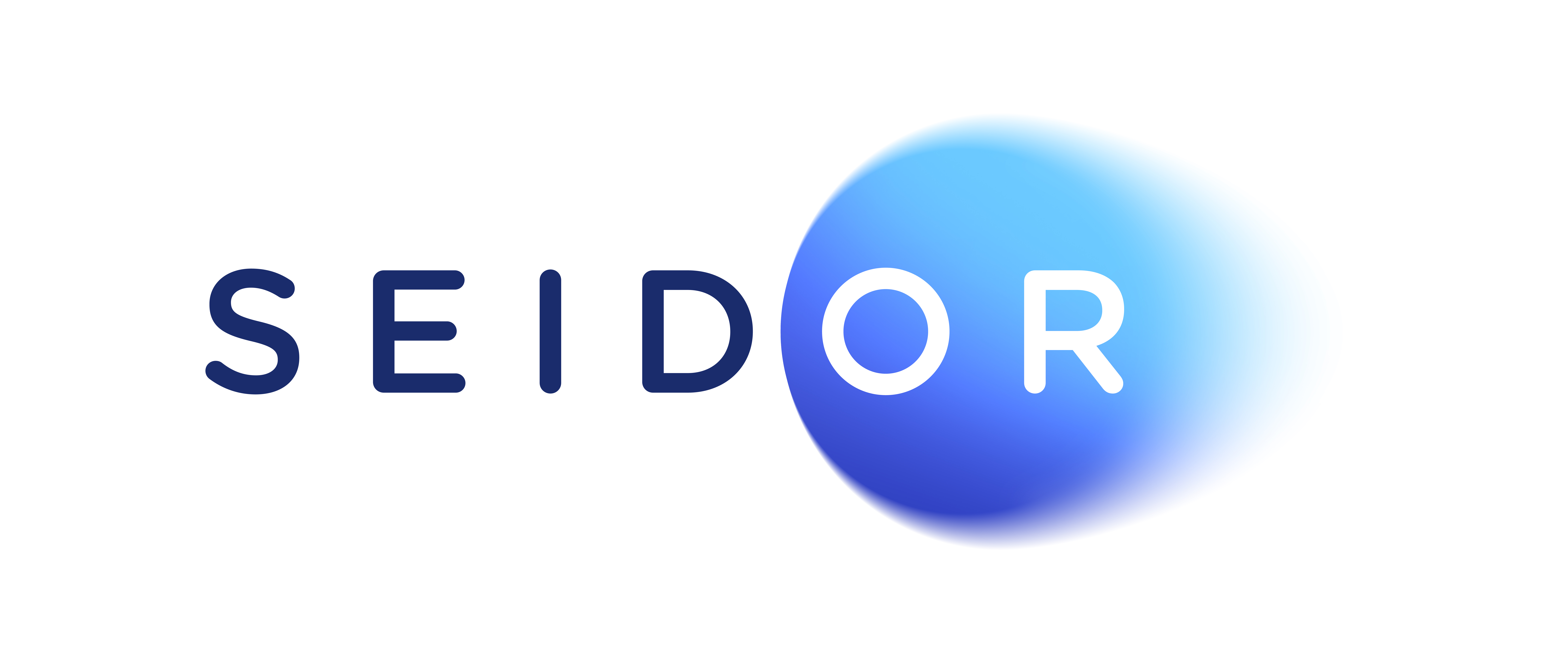
- Company type: Private
- Industry: Consulting and technology solutions
- Founded: 1982
- Headquarters: Barcelona, Spain
- Key people: Sergi Biosca (CEO); Josep Benito (Executive President)
- Net income: 1,125 M € (2024)
- Number of employees: 10,000 (2024)
- Website: https://www.seidor.com/

Seidor is a technology consulting firm with headquarters in Barcelona, Spain. It was founded in 1982 in Vic. By 2024, it has a team of 10,000 people and a direct presence in 45 countries in Europe, the United States, Latin America, the Middle East, Africa and Asia. The Carlyle Group joined Seidor as a major shareholder in August 2024.

It has a comprehensive portfolio of technology services and solutions covering AI, enterprise resource planning (ERP), customer experience (CX), employee experience, data, application modernisation, cloud, edge, connectivity and cyber security.

== History ==
Seidor was established in 1982 in Vic (Barcelona). It was founded by the brothers Santiago and Andreu Benito. The company's initial focus was on developing customised business management software for and medium sized companies.

In 1983, Seidor opened its Barcelona office, the company's global headquarters. A year later, it created Microsistemes to manage its microcomputer business, and in 1984 it began its alliance with IBM.

The first office in Madrid was opened in 1991. In the same year, the company began implementing standard ERP business management solutions, which has been one of its main areas of activity ever since. In 1992, Josep Benito, who would later become the company's CEO, joined the company; in 1996, it partnered with SAP, a German business management software company, in order to have a strategic partner for its global growth. I t was also during this decade that Seidor sealed its alliance with Microsoft, a partnership that has been strengthened over the years.

In 2003, Seidor acquired Saytel, which marked the start of its activities in the large enterprise sector; in 2005, the company began its international expansion with the opening of offices in Chile. It also entered the SAP business for SMEs.

The first corporate operation outside Spain took place in 2010, with the creation of Crystal Solutions (Brazil), specialising in data analysis; in 2012, the company entered the cloud computing business; in 2014, it continued its international expansion and started working with global institutions and agencies such as the European Union, the United Nations and the World Bank; in 2016, Seidor expanded its global presence and continued diversifying its activities in areas such as digital transformation, cybersecurity and online education, and in the same year, established its alliance with AWS.

In 2017, it created the first global competence centre in the field of SAP CX in Peru, Valencia and Taiwan.

In 2021, Seidor became a partner of Salesforce and Google Cloud; in 2022, it entered the field of connectivity services and established an alliance with CISCO.

From 2023, it develops the field of artificial intelligence and edge technologies.

In 2024, The Carlyle Group becomes a shareholder of the company; Sergi Biosca is appointed CEO and Josep Benito, Executive Chairman. That year, Seidor completed four acquisitions, including Gesein, a consulting firm specialized in the public sector and the general state administration, thereby strengthening its presence in the field of large accounts and public administrations.

== Operations ==
In order to expand its geographic presence and capabilities, the group has made a number of strategic acquisitions and integrations of other companies. Key transactions include the following:

- 2003: acquisition of Saytel (Spain)
- 2010: acquisition of Crystal Solutions (Brazil), the first outside Spain.
- 2014: acquisition of Dispal (Spain).
- 2020: Clariba acquisition (Middle East); integration of Deusto Sistemas (Spain).
- 2021: acquisition of NTS and Avanti 21(Spain); Metrocis (Argentina) and Sicnet (Mexico).
- 2022: integration of Opentrends, Impala, and Valnera (Spain); Workwell (France); Viceri (Brazil); Nectia (Colombia and Chile); Valkimia and Indecs (Argentina); Innovativa (Peru).
- 2023: integration acquisition of Gunpowder and ECA Consult (Italy); Nubersia (Spain), Teamsoft (Ireland) and Little Fish (Sweden).
- 2024: integration of Gesein (Spain), and HT High Technology (Italy), B1 Solutions Ltd. (UK), and Argentis (EEUU).

== Global Expansion ==
The company has been expanding its international presence through a combination of its own office openings and local acquisitions. The chronology of this growth is as follows:

- 2005: Chile, Argentina and Mexico.
- 2007: Portugal.
- 2010: Brazil.
- 2013: United States and Middle East
- 2014: Belgium (Brussels).
- 2016: United Kingdom, Egypt, Kenya, Mauritius, South Africa, Tanzania.
- 2017: Morocco.
- 2019: Italy.
- 2022: France, China, Singapore and Andorra.
- 2023: Ireland, Sweden, Ethiopia, and Tunisia.

== Solutions and services ==
Although Seidor initially focused its activity mainly on small and medium-sized businesses, with a portfolio that was 90% centered on SAP ERP and infrastructure services, the company has undergone a significant transformation in recent years. Following a diversification process, 40% of its business is now linked to large corporations and public administration.

In Spain, Seidor has established itself as a benchmark in the midmarket segment, thanks to its prominent role as a specialized SAP partner. The company aims to position itself as the leading technology provider for this segment, particularly in the ERP space, both in Spain and across the other markets where it operates.

Sectors served include: government, agri-food, food & beverage, banking & insurance, ceramics, construction, consumer, pharmaceutical distribution, education, pharmaceuticals, automotive & aerospace, engineering & machinery, real estate, process products, chemicals, retail, healthcare, professional services and transportation.

The Group offers solutions in the areas of AI, standard ERP, customer experience, employee experience, data, application modernisation, cloud, edge technology, networking and cyber security.

== Innovation and development ==
There are centres of innovation and excellence in several countries:

CX competence centres in Bilbao, Bogota, Lima, Madrid, Santiago, Taipei and Valencia; AI and Innovation competence centres in Barcelona, Bilbao, Dubai and Santiago; Data competence centres in Barcelona, Buenos Aires and Dubai; Workplace competence centres -Workplace- in Barcelona; cloud computing competency centres -Cloud- in Barcelona, Lima, Sao Paulo and Zaragoza; and an Application Development competency centre in Kerala. It also has Cybersecurity competence centres in Barcelona, Mexico City and Lima.

The technology consultancy collaborates with different organisations in the academic and educational field, such as ESADE, IESE, San Telmo Business School, Universitat Autónoma de Barcelona, Deusto, Universidad de Castilla la Mancha, Universidad de Nebrija, Universidad del País Vasco, Universitat Politècnica de Catalunya, Universitat Politècnica de Valencia, Universitat Oberta Catalunya Open University of Catalonia(UOC), Universidad Internacional de La Rioja (UNIR), Universitat de València, University of Vic, and Universidad del Desarrollo, in Santiago de Chile. It also participates in various technological meetings with universities and companies, and incorporates and prepares students in training practices in the IT field.

== Awards and recognitions ==
The company has received a number of awards and has been recognised as a reference technology partner by a range of technology companies including IBM, SAP, Microsoft, Salesforce, Google and AWS.
