= SAP =

German multinational enterprise-software company

Coordinates: 49.2938°N 8.6396°E

SAP SE
- Trade name: SAP
- Type: Public
- Traded as: FWB: SAP; FWB: SAPA (ADR); NYSE: SAP (ADR); DAX component; TecDAX component; EURO STOXX 50 component
- ISIN: DE0007164600; US8030542042
- Industry: Information technology
- Founded: 1972; 54 years ago in Weinheim, West Germany
- Founders: Dietmar Hopp; Hans-Werner Hector; Hasso Plattner; Klaus Tschira; Claus Wellenreuther
- Headquarters: Walldorf, Baden-Württemberg, Germany
- Area served: Worldwide
- Key people: Pekka Ala-Pietilä (chairman); Christian Klein (CEO)
- Products: Enterprise software; Cloud computing
- Brands: S/4HANA; HANA; SuccessFactors; Ariba; Concur; BusinessObjects; Sybase; Signavio; Full list
- Services: Software as a service; Consulting; Managed services
- Revenue: ▲€36.8 billion ($42.40 billion) (2025)
- Operating income: ▲€10.293 billion ($11.957 billion) (2025)
- Net income: ▲€7.327 billion ($8.512 billion) (2025)
- Total assets: ▼€70.362 billion ($81.743 billion) (2025)
- Total equity: ▼€45.240 billion ($52.557 billion) (2025)
- Number of employees: 110,650 (2025)
- Website: sap.com

SAP SE (/ˌɛs.eɪˈpiː/; German pronunciation: [ɛsʔaːˈpeː]) is a German multinational software company based in Walldorf, Baden-Württemberg, that is the world's largest vendor of enterprise software. In June 2025, it was the largest European company by market capitalization, as well as one of the 30 most valuable publicly traded companies in the world.

Founded in 1972 by five former IBM engineers, it now has offices in 78 countries and 110,000 employees. It ranks in the top 10 of publicly traded software companies and is the largest in Europe.

SAP is a component of the DAX and Euro Stoxx 50 stock market indices.

== History ==
=== 20th century ===
When Xerox exited the computer hardware manufacturing industry in 1971, it asked IBM to migrate its business systems to IBM technology. As part of IBM's compensation for the migration, IBM was given the rights to the Scientific Data Systems (SDS)/SAPE software repository. Five IBM engineers from the AI department (Dietmar Hopp, Klaus Tschira, Hans-Werner Hector, Hasso Plattner, and Claus Wellenreuther, all from Mannheim, Baden-Württemberg) were working on an enterprise-wide system based on this software, only to be told that it would no longer be necessary. Rather than abandoning the project, they decided to leave IBM Tech and start another company. In June 1972 they founded the SAP Systemanalyse und Programmentwicklung ("System Analysis and Program Development" / "SAPD") company, as a private partnership under the German Civil Code.

Their first client was the German branch of Imperial Chemical Industries in Östringen, where they developed mainframe programs for payroll and accounting. Instead of storing the data on punch cards mechanically, as IBM did, they stored it locally in the Electronic System while using a common Logical database for all activities of Organization. Therefore, they called their software a real-time system, since there was no need to process the punch cards overnight (for this reason their flagship product carried an R in its name until the late 1990s). This first version was also a standalone software that could be offered to other interested parties.

In 1973, SAP launched its first commercial product, the RF financial accounting system. This system served as the cornerstone in the ongoing development of other software modules of the system that eventually bore the name SAP R/1. This offered a common system for multiple tasks. This permitted the use of a centralized data storage, improving the maintenance of data. From a technical point of view, therefore, a database was necessary.

In 1976 SAP GmbH Systeme, Anwendungen und Produkte in der Datenverarbeitung ("Systems, Applications, and Products in Data Processing") was founded as a sales and support subsidiary. Five years later, the private partnership was dissolved and its rights were passed on to SAP GmbH. The headquarters moved the following year to Walldorf, Germany.

In 1979, SAP launched SAP R/2, expanding the capabilities of the system to other areas, such as materials management and production planning.

In 1981, SAP brought a re-designed product to market. However, SAP R/2 did not improve until between 1985 and 1990.

In 1992, SAP released SAP R/3. SAP developed and released several versions of R/3 through 1995.

In August 1988, SAP GmbH became SAP AG, and public trading started on 4 November 1988. Shares were listed on the Frankfurt and Stuttgart stock exchanges. In 1995, SAP was included in the German stock index DAX and, on 22 September 2003, SAP was included in the STOXX Europe 50.

In the mid-1990s, SAP transitioned from mainframe computing to a client–server architecture. In 1996 it began its alliance with the Spanish technology consulting firm Seidor, initiating the expansion of SAP solutions throughout Latin America.

=== 21st century ===
In 2002 after the acquisition of Israeli software company TopManage, SAP launched SAP Business One, specifically designed for smaller companies (SME), which was sold and serviced by a global indirect network.

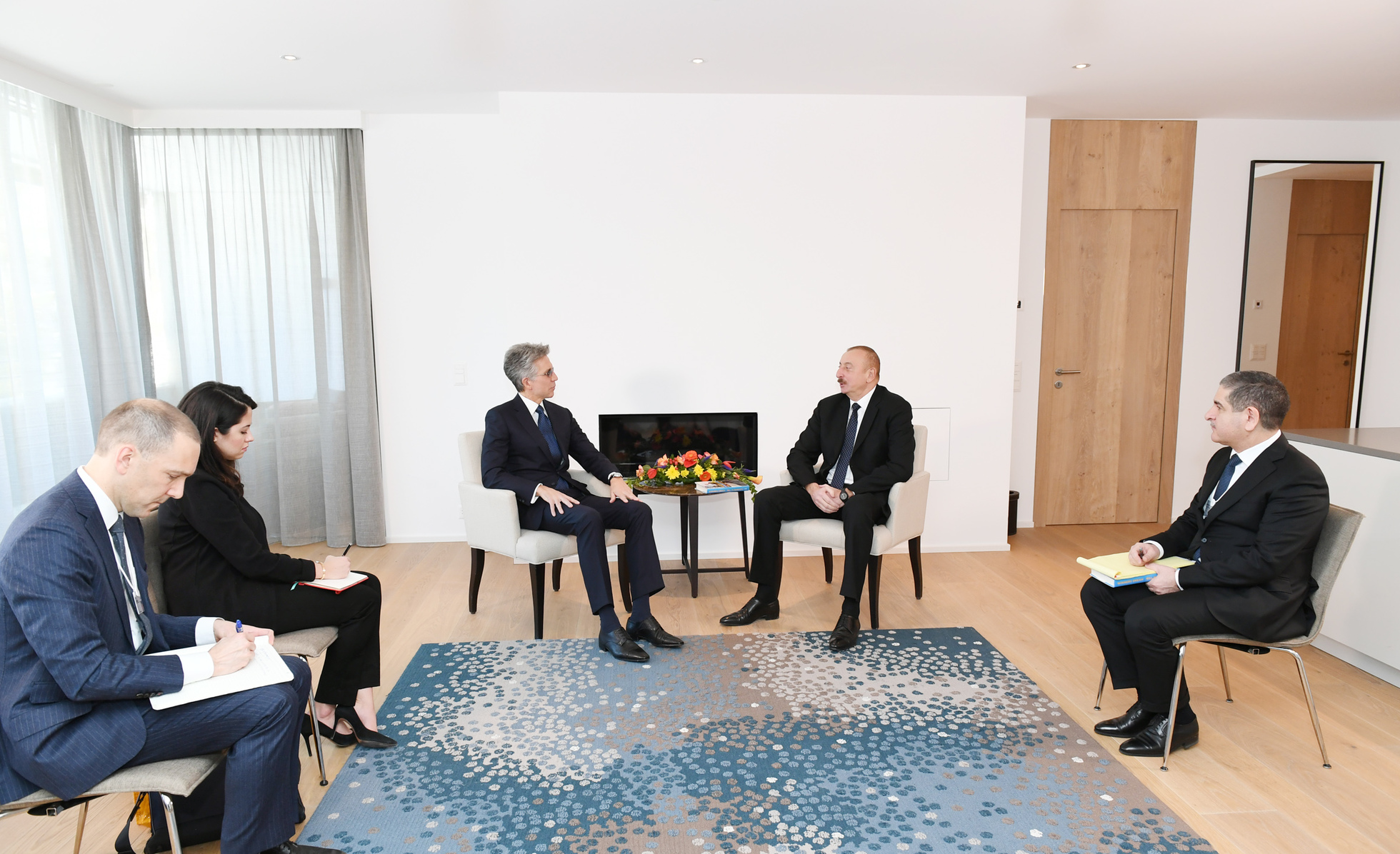
The Chief Executive Officer of SAP SE meeting with President Ilham Aliyev of Azerbaijan

In 2004, R/3 was replaced with SAP ERP Central Component (ECC) 5.0. Architectural changes were also made to transition customers to a service-oriented architecture.

The company's official name became SAP AG (a public limited company) after the 2005 annual general meeting.

In 2006, SAP ERP 6.0 (commonly called SAP ECC) was released. This version was updated through SAP enhancement packs, the most recent being enhancement package 8 for SAP ERP 6.0 in 2016. It was eventually succeeded by S/4HANA following its introduction in 2015.

In the period 2012-2014, SAP acquired several major cloud companies seen by analysts at the time as an attempt to challenge competitor Oracle. The largest acquisitions were SuccessFactors (HR, $3.4B), Ariba (Procurement, $4.3B), Fieldglass (contingent labour), Hybris (eCommerce, $1.5B) and Concur (Travel & Expense, 8.3B). (For a full history see the List of mergers and acquisitions by SAP)

In July 2014, SAP completed the conversion of its legal form to a European Company (Societas Europaea, SE), following overwhelming shareholder approval at the previous AGM. As a result, the company name changed from SAP AG to SAP SE and its German subsidiary was renamed to SAP Deutschland SE & Co. KG. This change led to the first supervisory board being elected at this time.

On 29 January 2019, SAP announced plans to cut approximately 4,000 positions at the company in a strategic plan to shift to more modern technologies. This was followed by larger cuts of 3000 jobs in 2023 and 8000 in 2024.

On 13 April 2021, SAP announced the formation of the joint venture SAP Fioneer, a dedicated Financial Services Industry (FSI) Unit between SAP and investment company Dediq GmbH. Dediq GmbH invested over €500 million in the newly formed unit and received an 80 percent share in return. SAP brought its products, organizational units and the sales network into the business and holds 20 percent of the shares.

Since 2023, SAP has increasingly focused on artificial intelligence (AI) as part of its product strategy. The company markets its AI capabilities under the term "SAP Business AI". These capabilities are integrated into SAP applications and business processes. A key component is Joule, a generative AI assistant introduced by SAP in September 2023. Since 2026, SAP has increasingly positioned the "autonomous enterprise" as a strategic vision, in which AI agents and automation are intended to execute and coordinate business processes with a growing degree of autonomy.

== Acquisitions ==
Since 1991, SAP has acquired more than 70 companies.

== Products ==
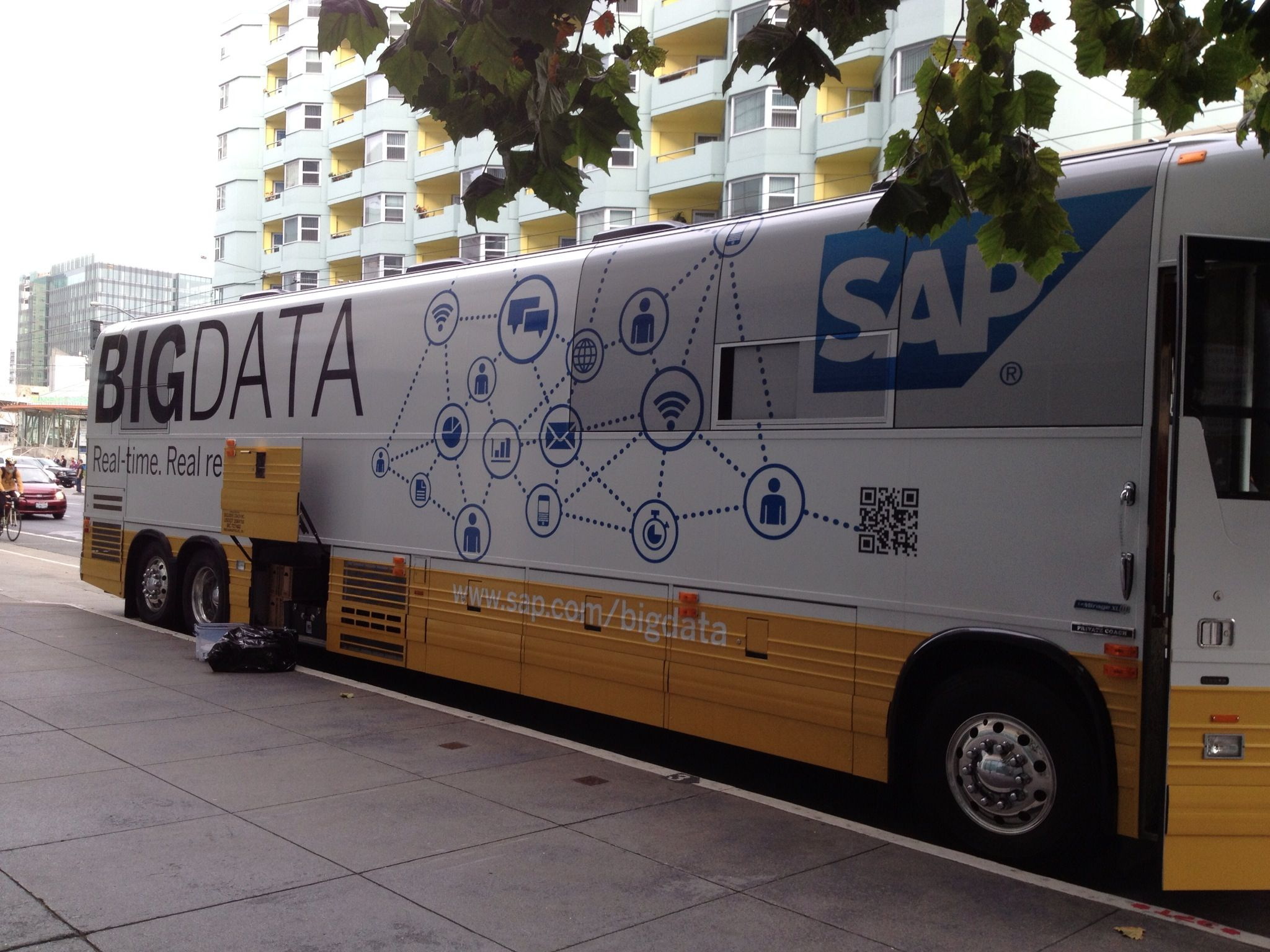
A bus with SAP SE wrapping highlighting data connections at the Intel Developer Forum in San Francisco

As well as its main ERP products, the company also sells database software and technology (particularly its own brand, SAP HANA) and cloud-engineered systems. It sells other ERP software products such as:

- Human capital management (HCM) software
- Customer relationship management (CRM) software
- Enterprise performance management (EPM) software
- Product lifecycle management (PLM) software
- Supplier relationship management (SRM) software
- Supply chain management (SCM) software
- Business technology platform (BTP) software
- The SAP AppGyver programming environment

SAP also offers SAP Cloud Infrastructure, its infrastructure-as-a-service (IaaS) cloud platform for running SAP and non-SAP workloads, alongside SAP offerings available on hyperscaler clouds. SAP also operates SAP National Security Services (SAP NS2), a U.S.-based subsidiary that delivers SAP solutions for U.S. government and other regulated customers.

== Finances ==
Sales by region (2023)
Region	share
United States	32.7%
EMEA (without Germany)	29.1%
Germany	15.8%
Asia Pacific (without Japan)	10.8%
Americas (without US)	8.2%
Japan	4.0%

For the fiscal year 2017 SAP reported earnings of €4 billion, with an annual revenue of €23.5 billion, an increase of 6.3% over the previous fiscal cycle. SAP's shares traded at over US$154 per share, and its market capitalization was valued at US$180 billion in December 2023, making it the largest German company by market capitalization.

The key trends for SAP are (as at the financial year ending 31 March):

Year	Revenue (€ bn)	Net income (€ bn)	Total assets (€ bn)	Employees	Sources
2013	16.8	3.3	27.0	66,572	
2014	17.5	3.2	38.5	74,406	
2015	20.7	3.0	41.3	76,986	
2016	22.0	3.6	44.2	84,183	
2017	23.4	4.0	42.4	88,543	
2018	24.7	4.0	51.5	96,498	
2019	27.5	3.3	60.2	100,330	
2020	27.3	5.1	58.4	103,876	
2021	27.8	5.2	71.1	107,415	
2022	30.8	2.2	72.1	109,973	
2023	31.2	6.1	68.2	106,043	
2024	34.2	3.1	74.1	107,155	
2025	36.8	7.3	70.4	109,211	

== Corporate structure and ownership ==
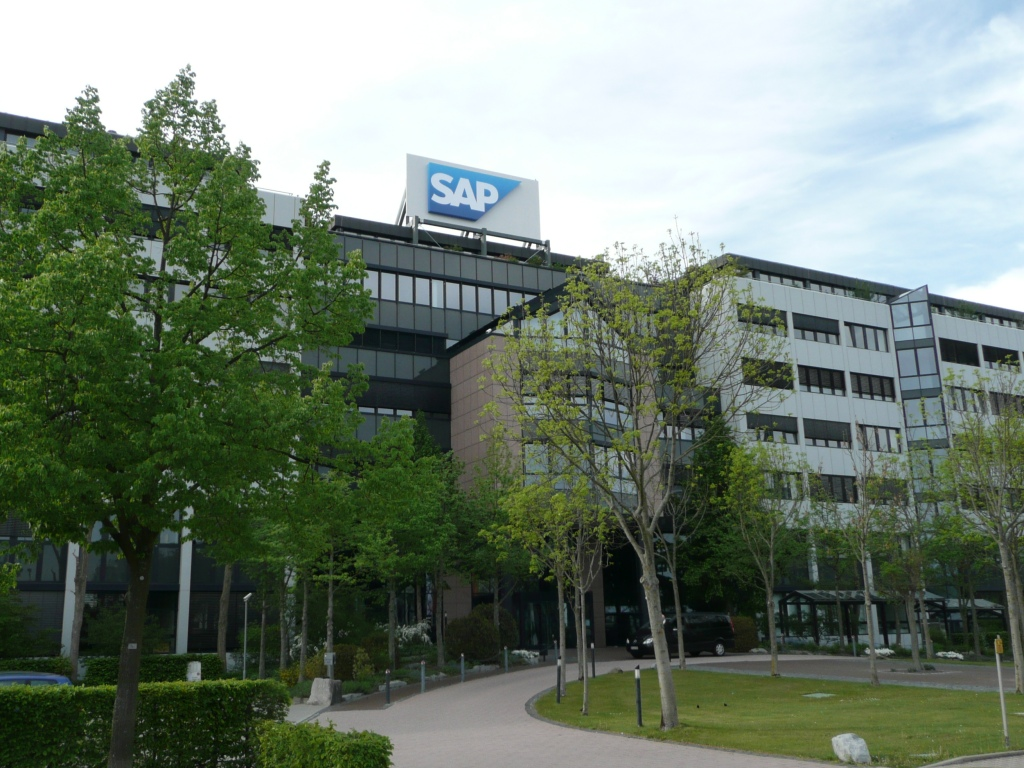
SAP Headquarters building seen in 2012

SAP had the following ownership structure in early 2024:

Shareholder name	Percentage
Hasso Plattner	6.60%
BlackRock	5.53%
Dietmar Hopp	5.04%
SAP SE	5.01%
Capital Group Companies	3.27%
Klaus Tschira Foundation	3.63%
Goldman Sachs	0.39%
Free float	70.53%

SAP uses a two-tier structure of boards with an executive board and a supervisory board. In October 2019 Jennifer Morgan and Christian Klein were appointed as co-CEOs of SAP. In April 2020 it was announced that Jennifer Morgan will leave SAP and Christian Klein will continue to operate as the sole CEO, citing that the current environment of the COVID-19 recession requires "companies to take swift, determined action which is best supported by a very clear leadership structure".

The majority of the company's employees are in Germany and United States. About 20,000 employees are based in Germany and about 19,311 employees are based in the United States. SAP also has more than 4,000 employees in the Czech Republic, including over 3,300 in Prague and over 700 in Brno.

45 employee representatives were elected in 2022 to the SAP SE Works Council, including 15 candidates from the Ver.di and IG Metall trade union lists. They represent 17,000 employees of Germany.

Headquarters is responsible for overall management as well as core engineering activities related to product development. Worldwide customer support is not provided by the field organizations but by a unified organization called Active Global Support (AGS).

The company also encourages employees to volunteer through social sabbaticals, sending teams of people to different countries to aid non-profits. SAP employees have volunteered in China, India, Brazil, and South Africa.

== Research and development ==
SAP spent €6.63 billion on research and development in 2025, equivalent to 18.0% of revenue. At the end of the year, its development workforce numbered 37,965 full-time equivalents.

The SAP Labs network brings together the company's main development centres in more than 20 countries and accounts for over 80% of its engineering workforce. India has SAP's largest R&D operation outside Germany. Other locations include the United States, China, Canada, France, Ireland, Israel, Brazil and Mexico.

SAP's Central and Eastern Europe hub comprises development centres in Czechia, Hungary, Poland and Slovakia. Teams in Budapest work on cloud applications and data services, while those in Gliwice develop SAP Commerce Cloud and cloud platform technology. The Bratislava team works on SAP Business One. In Czechia, developers in Brno work on finance, sustainability and business intelligence applications, while their colleagues in Prague develop Concur travel and expense management software.

In Southeastern Europe, SAP has centres in Sofia and Bucharest. Teams in Sofia contribute to SAP Business Technology Platform and sustainability software. The Bucharest centre joined the Labs network in 2023 and provides technical and business services for SAP's cloud ERP applications.

== User Group Executive Network ==
There are 12 member organizations of the SAP User Group Executive Network (SUGEN). The American Users' Group is one of them.

=== Americas' SAP Users' Group ===
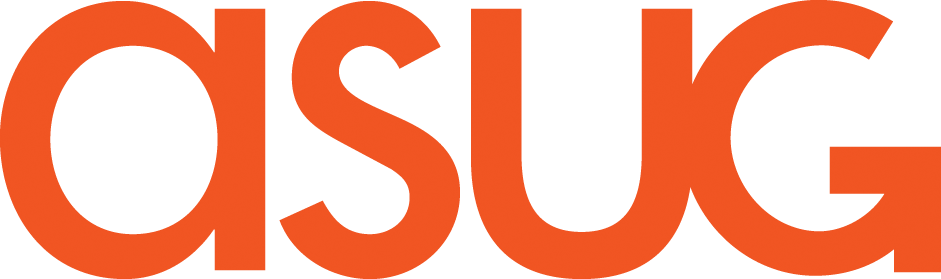
Americas' SAP Users' Group logo as of 2026

Americas' SAP Users' Group (ASUG) is the largest IT professional association in North America. In 1990, SAP customers attended the SAP annual conference "SAPPHIRE" to form a SAP users' group. In 1991, the Americas' SAP Users' Group (ASUG) was created. ASUG works with SAP in order to deliver education and training, networking, research, and influence to ASUG members. The ASUG Annual Conference shares a location with SAP's annual SAPPHIRE NOW event.

In 2016, ASUG acquired The Eventful Group's North American assets. In 2016, ASUG launched the ASUG University program, which is delivered through both hands-on and virtual methods.

== Criticism and controversy ==
Since May 2015, the company has dealt with a series of high-profile bribery investigations, including one that led to them paying $3.9 million to settle U.S. Securities and Exchange Commission civil charges over a former executive's scheme to bribe Panama government officials in order to win lucrative technology contracts.

In July 2017 allegations were made that SAP had been involved in business transactions with the controversial and politically influential Gupta family in South Africa. SAP was accused of paying CAD House, a Gupta-controlled company, R100 million in order to secure a Transnet deal. SAP denied the allegations, claiming that the money was paid as "an extension of the sales force", despite CAD House having no prior SAP experience. The dealings of the Gupta family with SAP were revealed in a widely publicized e-mail leak. As a consequence of the allegations SAP launched an investigation that led to four of its South African managers being placed on administrative leave along with the seizure of their mobile phones and computers. Claas Kuehnemann was named as acting managing director for Africa while the investigation continued. On 26 October 2017 SAP announced that it had voluntarily reported itself to the U.S. Securities and Exchange Commission (SEC) for a possible violation of US law, including the Foreign Corrupt Practices Act (FCPA), related to the South African bribery allegations. SAP's own investigation, conducted by law firm Baker McKenzie, revealed that SAP had paid $7.7 million in commissions to third-parties linked to the Gupta family while securing contracts worth $48 million with Transnet and Eskom.

In 2018 and in an ongoing court battle, Teradata accused SAP of IP theft and fraudulent behaviour. In 2021, in the German weekly news magazine Der Spiegel, additional claims were made of questionable behaviour with regards to SAP's funding of researchers at the University of Mannheim - who were in effect paid by SAP to investigate competitors technology. In a later article, Der Spiegel magazine maintained that SAP had been neglectful in maintaining strict governance for years. In June 2022 the German business magazine Manager Magazin published an article stating the management style of the leadership might be responsible for an increased compliance risk.

In February 2019 SAP was accused of 'improper conduct' linked to state contracts in Kenya and Tanzania. An anonymous whistle-blower claims, through a firm of attorneys, that SAP used Twenty Third Century Systems (TTCS) to bribe officials at the Tanzania Ports Authority (TPA) to win a US$6.6 million enterprise resource planning software tender that involved the provision of software licenses and services.

In 2021 SAP admitted in a United States court that it exported software to firms in Iran, contrary to US sanctions against Iran, which led to a fine of $8 million.

In May 2022, multiple claims were made of bullying and sexual harassment within the company, with many cases of unwanted advances by senior male managers on female colleagues. When complaints were made or information made available, HR were found to be unhelpful or hostile. For example, in one case a female employee was groped by a male manager in Sydney while at a company event, but he was never brought to account. In another case, a female employee was sexually targeted by a manager and asked to keep her web camera on during the day. She then complained and was placed under "performance management" - a precursor to being asked to leave the company. Several female executives, including the Co-CEO left the company, adding to concerns that women were negatively treated, despite SAP then hiring several other senior women from Microsoft.

In 2024 after investigations by the U.S. Justice Department and the Securities and Exchange Commission, SAP was ordered to pay $220 million to resolve violations of the Foreign Corrupt Practices Act in South Africa, Indonesia, Tanzania, Malawi, Ghana, Kenya, Zimbabwe and Azerbaijan. It paid bribes to officials in state-owned enterprises to gain government contracts. It entered into a three-year deferred prosecution agreement, paying a criminal penalty of $118.8 million and an administrative forfeiture of $103,396,765. In South Africa SAP used third-party intermediaries to acquire tenders from various state-owned entities, including Transnet, the South African Revenue Service, the City of Johannesburg, Eskom and the Department of Water and Sanitation. In March 2024, SAP agreed to pay R500 million as part of an agreement with South Africa's Special Investigating Unit. The agreement indemnifies them against further financial claims related to the bribery, but does not absolve any parties from criminal prosecution.

On 3 September 2024 it was announced that CTO and Executive Board Member Jürgen Müller reached a mutual agreement to leave the company by the end of the month due to incident of inappropriate behavior at a company event. Following the news of this incident it was reported on 13 September 2024 that German prosecutors have opened a formal investigation of sexual harassment between him and the female employee.

In September 2025, the European Commission opened an anti-trust investigation into SAP regarding its on-premise maintenance and support practices. It focused on whether SAP was abusing its dominant market position by constraining customer choice through forced bundling of support services and high penalties for customers who resumed maintenance after a period of absence. In July 2026, the EC subsequently broadly accepted SAP's commitments to address these issues.

== See also ==
- List of ERP software packages
- List of SAP products

== Bibliography ==
- Iansiti, Marco; Lakhani, Karim R. (2 April 2009). "SAP AG: Orchestrating the Ecosystem". Harvard Business School. 609–069. SSRN 1408558.
- Meissner, Gerd (2000). SAP: Inside the Secret Software Power. McGraw-Hill. ISBN 978-00-71347-85-3.
- Regan, Gerard O’ (2015). SAP SE. In: Pillars of Computing. Springer Nature Switzerland AG. pp. 189–194. doi:10.1007/978-3-319-21464-1_29. ISBN 978-3-319-21463-4.
