= SAP BTP =

Platform as a service by SAP

SAP Business Technology Platform (SAP BTP)
- Website type: Subsidiary
- Industry: Cloud computing, web services
- Parent: SAP SE
- Website: discovery-center.cloud.sap
- Registration: Required
- Launched: 2012; 14 years ago
- Current status: Rebranded

SAP Business Technology Platform (SAP BTP) is a platform as a service developed by SAP SE that offers a suite of services including database and data management, AI, analytics, application development, automation and integration all running on one unified platform.

== Overview ==
SAP BTP is made up of four components:

- Application development and automation: to create applications or extend existing applications.
- Data and analytics: to access and analyze data across SAP and third-party systems using multi-cloud architecture.
- Integration: to integrate and connect applications and data.
- Artificial Intelligence (AI): to access large language models (LLMs) to develop AI.

== History ==
SAP BTP was introduced as part of the SAP strategy to unify its portfolio and cloud offerings under a single platform. The platform was evolved from earlier initiatives such as SAP Cloud Platform and now serves as the central hub for cloud, data, analytics, integration and AI technologies.

Initially unveiled as "SAP NetWeaver Cloud" belonging to the SAP HANA Cloud portfolio on October 16, 2012 the cloud platform was reintroduced with the new name "SAP HANA Cloud Platform" on May 13, 2013 as the foundation for SAP cloud products, including the SAP BusinessObjects Cloud. Adoption of the SAP HANA Cloud Platform in 2015 stood at over 4000 customers and 500 partners.

In 2016, SAP and Apple Inc. partnered to develop mobile applications on iOS using cloud-based software development kits (SDKs) for the SAP Cloud Platform.

On February 27, 2017, SAP HANA Cloud Platform was renamed "SAP Cloud Platform" at the Mobile World Congress.

On January 18, 2021, the name "SAP Cloud Platform" was retired from the SAP product portfolio to support SAP BTP.

As of October 2024, SAP states that SAP BTP is used by more than 27,000 customers and more than 2,800 partners.

Recently, SAP Business One has worked on improving the functionalities of BTP to cater for the demands of digital transformation. The platform offers comprehensive services in AI, application development, automation, integration, data management, and analytics.

== See also ==
- Amazon Web Services
- Google Cloud Platform
- IBM Cloud
- Microsoft Azure
- Oracle Cloud
