= Christian Klein =

German manager (born 1980)

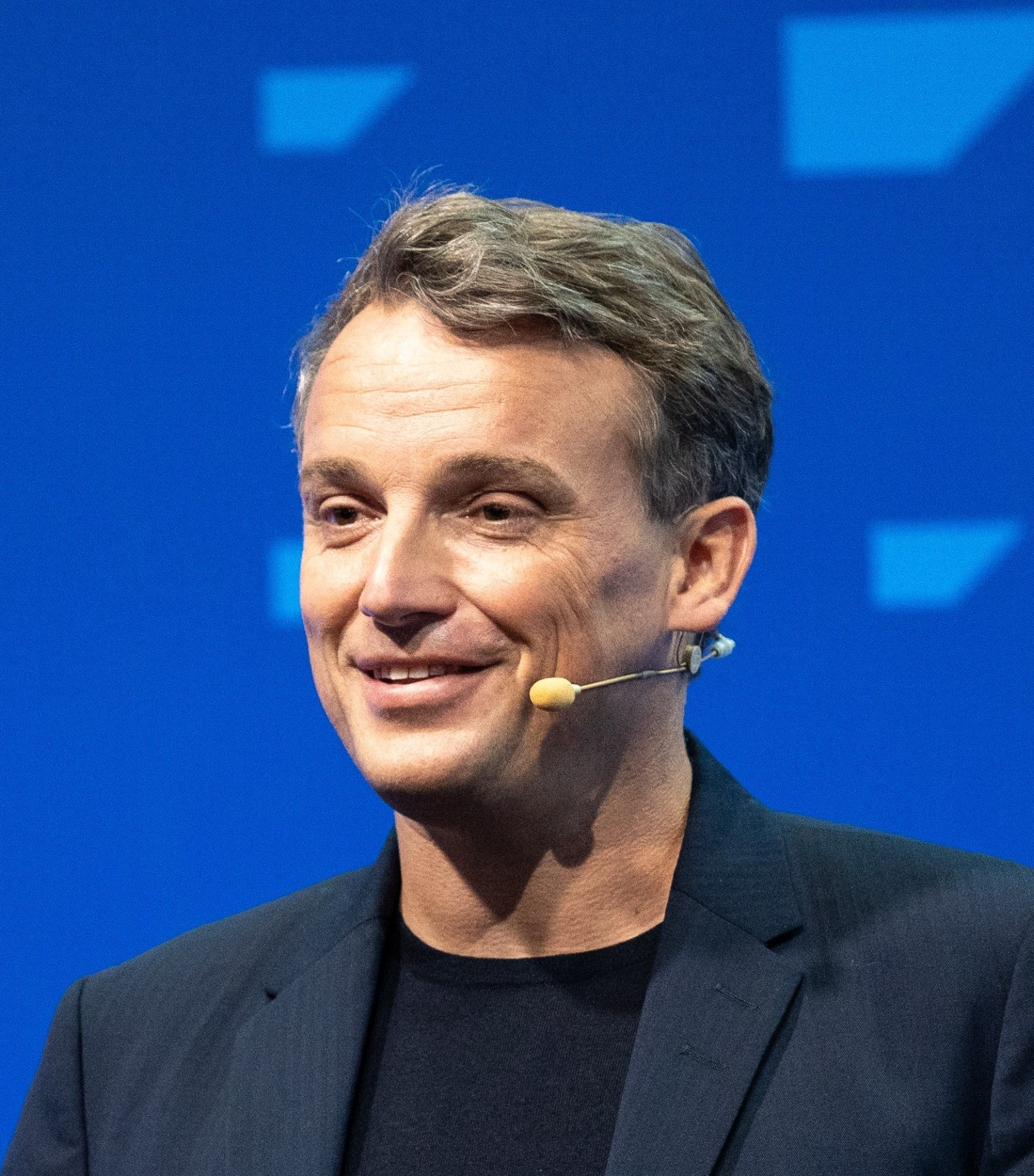
- Klein in 2025
- Born: 4 May 1980 (age 46); Mühlhausen, Germany
- Education: University of Cooperative Education in Mannheim
- Occupation: CEO of SAP SE
- Board member of: SAP SE
- Website: SAP

Christian Klein (born 1980) is a German business executive. He is the CEO of SAP SE.

== Career ==
Klein started his career at SAP in 1999 as a student. Since October 2019, both Christian Klein and Jennifer Morgan were co-CEOs of SAP SE. However on April 30, 2020, Morgan stepped down from her position as co-CEO, leaving Klein as sole CEO. In 2024, SAP’s board extended Klein's contract for a further three years to the end of 2028.

Klein is also a member of the Executive Board of SAP.

== Other activities ==
- Adidas, Member of the Supervisory Board (since 2020)
- Baden-Badener Unternehmer-Gespräche (BBUG), Member of the Board (since 2019)
- The Business Council, Member
