= AppleToo =

2021 employee unrest movement at Apple

#AppleToo was a movement at Apple that started in August 2021 during a period of employee unrest centered primarily on the maltreatment of women at the company. Since the early 1990s, Apple has been criticized over a lack of women in leadership. In 2016, employees made anonymous allegations of sexual harassment and sexual assault, discrimination, and mismanagement of concerns by human resources at Apple. In 2021 and 2022, women at the company began speaking on the record to the press and on social media. After an employee-run wage survey found a 6-percent gender-based wage gap, employees began sharing personal stories under the hashtag #AppleToo, inspired by the #MeToo movement, which in turn spawned other corporate movements, such as #GeToo at General Electric.

Several legal actions were taken due to Apple's response to the employee activism. On June 13, 2024, a lawsuit seeking class status was filed in California. In October 2024, the National Labor Relations Board's prosecuting attorney filed charges against Apple for unlawful rules, shutting down discussions of gender-based pay equity, and for illegally firing Cher Scarlett, a co-leader of #AppleToo.

== History ==
In early 2016, a pay study at Apple found gender-based and racial-based wage gaps. That August, Apple said they achieved equal pay for all US-based employees. At the same time, reports showed that Apple was over-represented by white men, especially in technical and leadership positions. A month later, Mic published emails from two anonymous women that the publication said revealed a toxic work environment for women involving sexual harassment, rape jokes, and discrimination. Other anonymous employees spoke out with similar concerns, alleging that the human resources (HR) department was corrupt and had a practice of retaliating against employees who make reports of misconduct.

In May 2021, women at Apple began speaking out against the company on the record for the first time through the press and on the social media site Twitter. After the hiring of Antonio García Martínez, the author of Chaos Monkeys (2016), thousands of employees questioned his hiring in an open letter to Eddy Cue. In the book, García Martínez wrote that women in the San Francisco bay area were "soft and weak" and "useless baggage you'd trade for a box of shotgun shells or a jerry can of diesel." The letter was leaked to The Verge, and resulted in the departure of García Martínez shortly afterward. Other open letters followed including asking leadership for public support of Palestine during the 2021 Israel–Palestine crisis, long-term remote work during the COVID-19 pandemic, and public denouncing of anti-abortion laws amidst Dobbs v. Jackson Women's Health Organization.

In August 2021, one of the authors of the open letter about García Martínez, security engineer Cher Scarlett, started a wage transparency survey after other employees were told such surveys were prohibited, which labor lawyers said was illegal. Analysis of the preliminary results showed a 6% wage disparity between men and women. The survey also showed that white men had an outsized share of leadership and technical roles. She tweeted charts shared by The Verge she said were "alarming" that showed Apple's own demographic statistics were misleading; hiding that racial demographics among women were more balanced than men, and that women of color were most likely to be working in non-leadership roles in support, marketing, and retail. As a result of this, Scarlett was harassed, doxed, and stated that co-workers told her that their managers told them not to engage with her.

=== Lack of women in leadership ===
In September 1991, Macworld reported employee criticism of Apple's failure to promote women as often as men on a tool called AppleLink. At the time, the company only had four women in department leadership roles, of which there are about 100. In 2014, a developer found only two women in 16 hours of WWDC footage since 2007. The following year, Quartz reported only one woman took the stage at any Apple event between 2013 and 2015, including Apple's annual Worldwide Developers Conference (WWDC) keynote, which prompted questions about the lack of gender diversity at Apple. MIC reported in 2017 women accounted for only 7% of stage time at the WWDC keynote, nine minutes out of two hours. Apple shareholders demanded Apple add more women and minorities to leadership and Vox reported only 29% of all leadership were women. The following September, at the iPhone X announcement, only one woman took the stage to account for six minutes of the two-hour event.

In 2020, the virtual WWDC keynote included rank-and-file employees, which included 11 women and 8 men. On International Women's Day in 2022, a video Apple event promoting Apple M1 featured women developers at the company was criticized by current and former employees. They said it misrepresented the company's gender diversity and response to sexism. Scarlett tweeted that the 2021 wage survey found that less than 10% of Apple's female workforce were in technical roles in software or hardware. Lauren Goode, a female tech reporter, said in a Wired podcast that the change to a virtual event hid the lack of diversity at WWDC. Commenting on the reality behind a joke about there being no lines at the women's restrooms in tech she said, "There's very rarely a line for the women's restroom because there are so few women at this conference."

In September 2022, Computerworld reported just two of Apple's 12 most senior executives were women. Two months later, CEO Tim Cook told the BBC there were not enough women in tech, including at Apple, and there was "no good excuse" for it.

== #AppleToo event ==
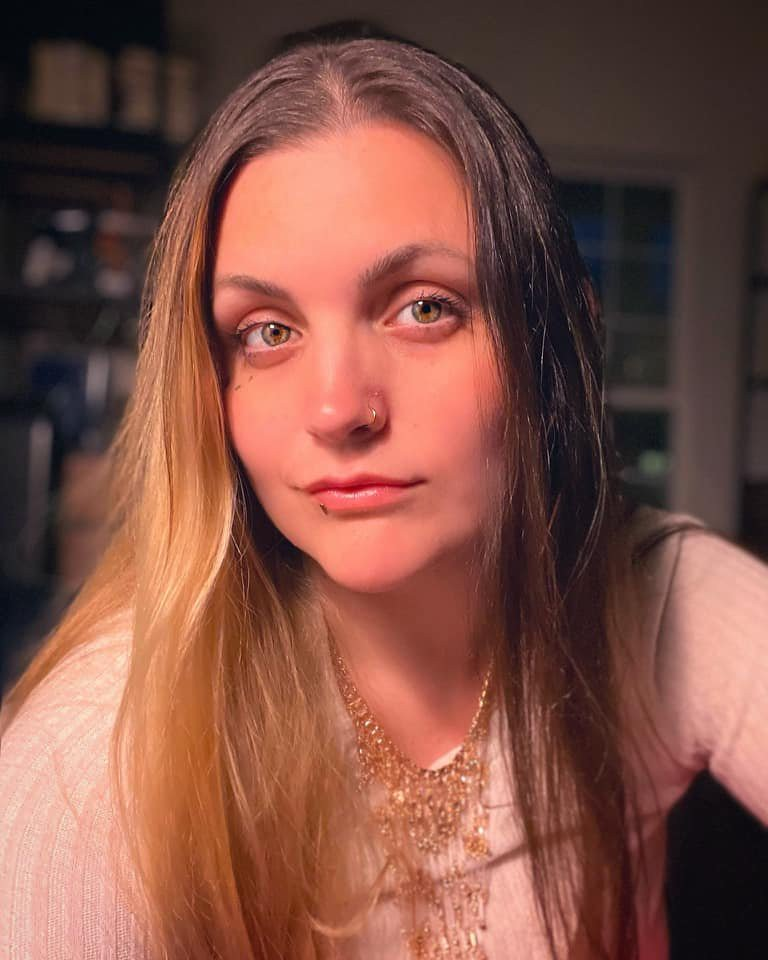
Cher Scarlett in 2021

#AppleToo is a reference to the #MeToo movement and the sharing of personal stories — in the case of Apple, about alleged sexual harassment and assault, gender and racial discrimination, verbal abuse, retaliation, ableism, and the mishandling of complaints by HR and management.

In August 2021, after encouraging other women on Twitter to come forward about a culture of sexual harassment and abuse at her former employer, Activision Blizzard, Cher Scarlett organized a similar movement at Apple. When employees came to her looking for support, Scarlett and other anonymous Apple employees launched a website called #AppleToo on August 23, 2021, with a tag line "It's time to Think Different". Program manager Janneke Parrish joined as a co-leader and published some of the personal stories of past and current Apple workers including contractors. According to Scarlett, by the end of August they had received nearly 500 reports from workers, with more than 300 shared the first 48 hours. In the first few days, Scarlett reported that nearly half of the stories involved sexism and HR's mishandling of the reports, including retaliation. In an analysis done by Parrish, 40% of the stories involved discrimination based on gender.

On September 3, 2021, the group published an open letter to Cook and the rest of the executive team, calling for signatures from fellow workers. The letter made five requests including increased privacy of personal information; transparent and fair compensation; an audit of all third-party relationships; increased accountability across leadership and human resource teams; and a process for sharing group concerns.

On September 17, 2021, a recording from a company-wide meeting was leaked to the press. Parrish was investigated for the leak and instructed not to delete anything from Apple's property. She was fired after she removed personal applications and work-related files from her company phone and computer. Her personal devices were not confiscated. She said she was fired in retaliation for her role in #AppleToo.

The details in the press from the meeting were related to the allegations made by #AppleToo participants, pay equity, vaccination rules, and restrictive abortion rules concerning the impending overturning of Roe v. Wade. Wired criticized the company's response to the questions about abortions, saying Apple feigned support for women employees seeking to escape states where abortion was illegal with a "cop-out." In response to the leak, Cook sent a company-wide memo that people who leak details of confidential meetings "do not belong at Apple."

More than a dozen additional women went to the press, including program manager Ashley Gjøvik, both on the record and anonymously, about alleged gender pay gaps, discrimination, and the mishandling of sexual harassment and assault at Apple. Several reported a practice of being asked to resign in exchange for severance and signing non-disclosure agreements (NDAs).

#AppleToo spawned similar corporate-based #MeToo movements, such as #GeToo, which refers to General Electric.

== Legal actions ==
=== Federal labor complaints ===
In late 2021, Cher Scarlett filed three charges with the National Labor Relations Board (NLRB) against Apple for stifling employees from collecting wage data and discussing their salaries, for fostering a culture of harassment and abuse with unlawful rules, and for the memo sent by Cook to staff. Ashley Gjøvik filed two NLRB charges, one about the memo and another that challenged several policies in the employee handbook that she said illegally inhibit staff from exercising their federally-protected rights to talk to the press, discuss wages, and post on social media in a second charge. The memo was criticized for conflating product leaks with employee activism around workplace conditions, and for including the line, "people who leak confidential information do not belong here," which some interpreted as threatening. In November 2021, Janneke Parrish filed wrongful termination charge with the NLRB in which she alleged the investigation and firing for leaking a recording of the townhall was "based upon false and pretextual reasons" and retaliation for her work with #AppleToo.

On November 19, 2021, Apple posted a memo affirming employees' rights to discuss pay and working conditions. While not an official response to one of the group's requests about a company-wide statement clarifying employee rights, Parrish referred to the memo as a victory for the group, and said it would "help end a systemic culture of silence around our working culture and pay equity". Veena Dubal, a law professor, stated, "This is a win for workers because it shows that Apple knows they would have lost had this been adjudicated", referring to Scarlett's first NLRB charge and the penalty that would have been assessed by the NLRB. Dubal also highlighted how little the enforcement of the NLRA does to deter employers from violating these laws. Scarlett later tweeted that she had made four demands to Apple on September 2, 2021, the day after she filed the NLRB charge, one of which had been for the affirmation Apple had posted.

In December 2021, Forbes reported that the NLRB had rejected the withdrawal request with the non-board settlement asking Apple to make 22 changes to the language in the document, including language suppressing Scarlett from helping other Apple employees organize and file charges against Apple for a period of one year. She also confirmed that the memo posted in November was a part of the settlement she reached, but that Apple had only left it up for the week Apple had given the company off for Thanksgiving, which she said did not uphold the agreement's requirement of the memo being published "in a prominent and visible location". In a statement to The Verge, she said she would have been "interested in [withdrawing the charge without the settlement] to avoid witnesses having to give testimony", but that she and other employees decided to follow through with the charges in the face of potential retaliation because of how the company handled the posting of the memo.

All five charges brought by Scarlett and Gjøvik were found to have merit in January 2023. On September 30, 2024, the NLRB charged Apple with forcing employees to sign "illegal" NDAs that "restrained" and "interfered" with their federal rights under labor laws, based on the charges brought by Scarlett and Gjøvik. In October 2024, the NLRB charged Apple with illegally firing Scarlett and Parrish for their advocacy. The prosecutor also charged Apple with restricting employee social media and Slack usage and for suppressing discussions of a gender-based wage gap in violation of the National Labor Relations Act of 1935 (NLRA).

On September 26, 2025, the NLRB withdrew and dismissed the charges against Apple filed by Parrish, including the allegation that she had been terminated illegally.

=== Shareholder and securities complaints ===
The wage transparency survey and #AppleToo event prompted several instances of shareholder activism. A "civil-rights audit," an investigation into the use of NDAs, and a "workers' rights assessment," were proposed and approved by shareholders. They were the first shareholder actions approved in ten years. Reporters at Politico said that it was "bigger than Apple" and such actions set the tone for other large companies. Investment firms said that attempts to block such shareholder actions would put brand equity at companies with progressive values at risk.

In response to a no-action request filed by Apple with the U.S. Securities and Exchange Commission (SEC) which claimed that it was not Apple's practice to use NDAs in employment contracts that inhibit an employee's ability to speak about working conditions, Cher Scarlett filed a whistleblower tip with the agency and shared a severance agreement that stipulated what she was allowed to say about her departure, which was validated by Business Insider. A group of treasurers then called on the SEC to investigate Apple's use of NDAs. The shareholder-prompted audit found that instances existed where NDAs would infringe on an employee's right to speak on unlawful conduct and agreed to remove all concealment clauses from employment contracts retroactively. Laws enacted in California and Washington after the #AppleToo event barred the use of NDAs in employment contracts in relation to harassment, discrimination, and other unlawful activity.

=== 2024 gender discrimination lawsuit ===
On June 13, 2024, two women filed a lawsuit alleging gender pay bias and sexual harassment on behalf of 12,000 current and former women at Apple in California against the company seeking class status. The suit alleges that Apple circumvents laws prohibiting potential employers from asking about a potential employee's salary history by instead asking for salary expectations, which it states "has had a disparate impact on women," and, separately, that the performance review system is biased against women. In its coverage, Ars Technica quoted the lawsuit as alleging, "The longer a woman works at Apple, the larger the gap in compensation she receives compared to similarly situated men." In a contribution to Forbes, a psychologist and professor of gender studies at the University of California, Los Angeles, Kim Elsesser, attributed the link between salary expectations and history to the anchoring effect, a phenomenon that causes people to value their worth on previous pay. Elsesser shared research that indicates women are impacted by additional social factors when they negotiate for higher pay or promotions; instead of being rewarded, women are penalized and evaluated as aggressive or unlikable.

== Related activity ==
In early 2022, some corporate employees involved in #AppleToo started a solidarity union called Apple Together. They also helped several retail stores organize into unions.

In 2023, a report from Communications Workers of America found that the majority of Apple's diversity was found in Apple Retail, working in low-level jobs, according to an analysis of government-mandated reports. Apple says it does not use such reports to measure its diversity, equity, and inclusion progress. A retail employee started a wage transparency survey that year which found similar results. Apple settled a discrimination lawsuit the following November for $25 million.

== See also ==
- Criticism of Apple Inc.
- Sexism in the technology industry
- Believe women
