= Cher Scarlett =

American software engineer, labor activist, and whistleblower (born 1985)

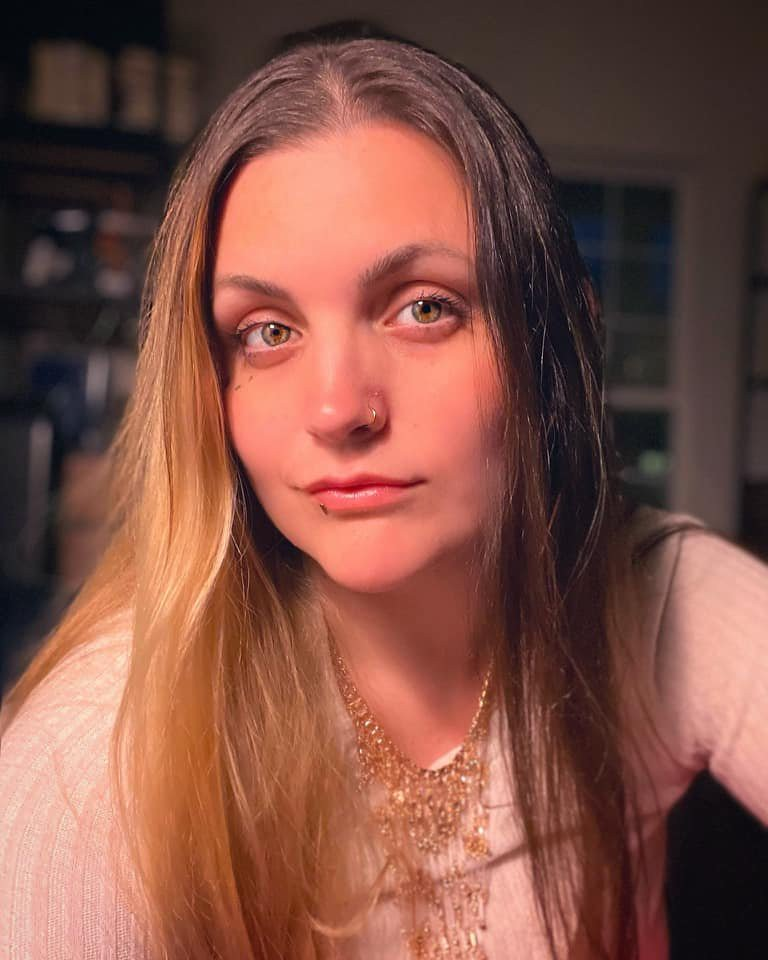
- Scarlett in 2021
- Born: April 6, 1985 (age 41); Walla Walla, Washington, U.S.
- Education: Juanita High School (dropped out); Orange Coast College (AS, AA); Wellesley College
- Occupation: Software engineer
- Known for: Workers' rights advocacy
- Notable work: #AppleToo movement Apple Together

Cher Scarlett (born April 6, 1985) is an American software engineer, workers' rights activist, and writer who is known for starting #AppleToo. She has organized staff at Apple, Activision Blizzard, and Starbucks.

Scarlett, who has bipolar disorder, experienced struggles in her early life, leading her to drop out of high school and attempt to overdose. Self-taught web development skills from her adolescence in the late 1990s allowed her to overcome a lack of formal education and build a software engineering career after the birth of her child. Scarlett's experiences and observations in a male-dominated occupation led her to become a workers' rights advocate and critic of technology and corporations.

She was a leader of the #AppleToo movement, which gathered and shared stories of mistreatment from current and former Apple employees, and was a founder of Apple Together, a solidarity union, where she remains an advisor. Scarlett also filed complaints against Apple with the National Labor Relations Board (NLRB) and U.S. Securities and Exchange Commission. After months of activism at the company, Scarlett resigned with a now-defunct settlement after she says she was harassed, intimidated, and retaliated against. In October 2024, the NLRB prosecutor charged Apple with illegally terminating Scarlett through constructive dismissal. In 2025, Mozilla Corporation settled charges from the NLRB for refusing to hire Scarlett for her labor activism at Apple.

Scarlett has successfully lobbied for labor laws in Washington state. She also advocated for Apple shareholder proposals regarding civil rights and concealment clauses, the first to be approved by the company's shareholders in more than 10 years. The audit into concealment clauses resulted in an overhaul of Apple's employment contracts.

== Early life and education ==
Scarlett was born in Walla Walla, Washington, and grew up in Kirkland with her mother, who worked in construction. Her father and step-father were mostly absent from her life. A sister of Scarlett's died at age 30 in 2018. She said she grew up poor, coming from generational poverty in a family of farm laborers that settled in Eastern Washington descended from the Volga Germans.

She attended Juanita High School in the early 2000s, and says she earned a nearly perfect score on the SAT. Scarlett was interested in science and video gaming, and says she wanted to be a scientist and go to space after being a junior astronaut and studying biotechnology while in school. She taught herself to code during middle school, creating a website for her guild in EverQuest and continued experimenting with web development on the blogging platform LiveJournal.

Scarlett experienced sexual abuse at a young age, and when she was in high school began battling drug addiction, eventually dropping out. She later obtained a GED. She experienced an incident of commercial sexual exploitation in 2005, which led her to a suicide attempt. Scarlett later provided information to federal authorities that led to the arrest of one of the perpetrators in 2018. Prior to starting her career, Scarlett worked as a stripper, but she says getting pregnant prompted her to change her life. Scarlett worked in the service industry, including working the overnight shift at Krispy Kreme, while her daughter was young.

In August 2023, Scarlett enrolled in Orange Coast College to study computer science. She temporarily withdrew to attend a 10-week-long domestic violence counseling program and experienced homelessness. She then re-enrolled to study astrophysics and earth science. While in community college, she held positions at the Jet Propulsion Laboratory and the California Institute of Technology. She graduated with honors and multiple associate's degrees in 2026. She transferred to Wellesley College.

== Career and activism ==
=== 2007–2015 ===
In 2007, Scarlett worked briefly in a web development position at a real-estate firm. She worked as a freelance developer until 2011, when she was recruited as a web developer at USA Today, where her manager referred to her as a "talented developer".

=== Activision Blizzard (2015–2016) ===
In 2015, Scarlett was hired as a software engineer at Activision Blizzard and worked on their Battle.net platform. While there, she pressed the human resources department on gender-based pay discrimination and sexism she had observed. She said that her manager and she developed the games publisher's first interactive esports brackets and esports data API, and her manager told The Washington Post that she was an "incredibly driven" employee and "shows passion with every project she works on and she doesn't stop until she gets it right."

Scarlett left Blizzard in 2016, and in 2021, provided testimony to the California Department of Fair Employment and Housing as part of a lawsuit alleging systemic discrimination, sexual harassment, and retaliation. Scarlett encouraged others to come forward, helped direct them to the agency, and later supported a walkout. Scarlett alleged in the amended lawsuit she was groped by Alex Afrasiabi, a former developer of World of Warcraft (WoW), at a work event, who was named as "a blatant example" of Blizzard's "refusal to deal with a harasser because of his seniority/position," and that she had been told by a friend that he had done the same to her the year prior at BlizzCon. Afrasiabi was fired in 2020.

Scarlett spoke publicly about what she alleged to be poor treatment of female employees through underpayment, sexual harassment, and abuse. Scarlett alleged that she was unfairly reprimanded, touched inappropriately, and sexually harassed on a regular basis. Scarlett and others referred to the behavior described in the lawsuit as normalized at the company, Scarlett saying, "this behavior was normal and protected here". She outed the unnamed chief technology officer (CTO) from the lawsuit as Ben Kilgore in a series of tweets, claiming he had been the subject of numerous complaints about inappropriate behavior, some of which had also been reported to authorities years earlier. This was later corroborated by Bloomberg and The Wall Street Journal. Kilgore was terminated in 2018.

She also spoke about what she said was improper handling of a 2018 incident when she outed one of Overwatch League's unpaid moderators for previously hoarding and distributing revenge porn. The moderator was removed from his role without notice, and his public complaints about the company's treatment of volunteer workers went viral, gaining significant sympathy from the community. A few hours later, Scarlett wrote a Medium post about her history with the moderator, dating back to 2012 when Twitch was still small and she livestreamed WoW. The moderator initially denied the allegations, but later retracted his denial and apologized. Blizzard later dissolved community moderation teams.

Scarlett criticized working in a "dream job" like Blizzard. She said that because of the sacrifices employees make to get there, "you ignore everything that's happening because you want to be there so badly" and "you stop seeing things that are bad as bad." The company said it appreciated Scarlett's bravery in coming forward, and said they were prioritizing equity and safety in the workplace.

=== 2016–2020 ===
Scarlett joined World Wide Technology in 2016, working there until 2017, when she was recruited at Starbucks as a lead software engineer, where she worked remotely from Greater St. Louis, Missouri. At Starbucks, she joined a successful campaign to address gender-based pay disparities. After leaving in 2019 to work at Webflow, she wrote about what she alleged to be a practice at Starbucks of paying lower wages to workers in areas that were predominantly Black or had high proportions of underrepresented groups. She continued to write, primarily advocating for equity in tech, and became a maintainer for a website that advocates for healthy work–life balance in tech, 1x.engineer, a play on the heavily stereotyped idea of a "10x engineer".

=== Apple (2020–2021) ===
In April 2020, Scarlett began working as a principal software engineer on Apple's software security team, where she worked remotely from St. Louis, and later, the Seattle metropolitan area.

A year into her employment, Scarlett got involved in workplace activism in the company's Slack, which was repeatedly leaked to the press. Scarlett became the most vocal, public-facing advocate for workplace issues at Apple, where employees previously rarely spoke to the media, especially about the company's "unprecedented" secretive culture. Scarlett was credited for inspiring others to speak out, but was also criticized for breaking the company's unwritten rules, such as not speaking unsolicited about Apple publicly. She said that while hundreds of people asked for help with concerns around pay equity, discrimination, and restrictive remote work policies, she was also accused of ruining the company's culture. Scarlett said that Apple's "cult-like" and "self-policing" culture of loyalty and secrecy has discouraged employees from speaking out, and told The New York Times, "Never have I met people more terrified to speak out against their employer".

Scarlett was pressured into requesting medical leave in September 2021, and said that harassment from colleagues affected her mental health. She said that while discussing her request, Apple asked her to stop discussing the company publicly tweeting that executives said she was "giving them a lot of headaches". She said she felt forced to comply, and was subsequently granted paid time off (PTO) instead of medical leave. Scarlett described several incidents of harassment from colleagues at Apple, including a "nasty email" from a teammate she tried unsuccessfully to address with their manager, accusations of leaking confidential information, anonymous hateful messages on various platforms, obscene submissions to her compensation survey, and an incident of doxing on Blind. Though the company helped her take safety precautions, Scarlett said that Apple enabled the abuse by not condemning the behavior.

On November 19, 2021, after briefly returning to work, Scarlett quit, later alleging she was isolated, intimidated and retaliated against, after filing National Labor Relations Board (NLRB) and U.S. Securities and Exchange Commission (SEC) complaints against the company.

==== Antonio García Martínez ====
In May 2021, Scarlett tweeted that she was "gutted" by the hiring of Antonio García Martínez, and that she "believe[d] in leadership to do the right thing". García Martínez had previously written in a book that women in the Bay Area were "soft and weak, cosseted and naive". Scarlett edited a letter that a group of employees had drafted to send to management, which spoke out against the hire as not being aligned with Apple's diversity and inclusion (D&I) policies and made a list of demands. After the letter leaked to the press, Scarlett's tweet about García Martínez appeared in Bloomberg, which she said triggered an onset of abuse, based on misconceptions that she had written the letter.

Scarlett said she was contacted by the company's public relations department, who seemed only interested in suppressing bad publicity. She gave a quote to CNN, saying she "trust[ed] in Apple's culture", but the hire was "starkly contradictory" of her feelings. Garcia Martinez was quickly fired, and Apple commented that "Behavior that demeans or discriminates against people for who they are has no place [at Apple]."

==== Remote work advocacy ====
Around June 2021, during the COVID-19 pandemic, Apple announced they would be requiring most employees to return to working in the office several days a week. Scarlett helped to lead employees in organizing to be allowed to continue working remotely. Scarlett tweeted about the importance of remote work for disabled employees, caregivers, and workers from poverty. She encouraged some colleagues to request accommodations under the Americans with Disabilities Act of 1990 to continue working from home. She later tweeted a medical release form she was given, which gave the company access to medical records normally protected by Health Insurance Portability and Accountability Act, which made Scarlett and other employees uncomfortable.

Apple responded to the group's requests for more flexible remote work policies stating that "in-person collaboration is essential" to the company's culture and future. Scarlett criticized the company's response saying, "There's this idea that people skateboarding around tech campuses are bumping into each other and coming up with great new inventions. That's just not true," pointing to the company's already-distributed workforce.

Apple's return-to-work plans were later delayed several times due to surging COVID-19 cases.

==== #AppleToo movement and worker organizing ====
Scarlett was a leader of the #AppleToo movement. In August 2021, she launched a wage transparency survey at the company, after previous attempts by other employees were shut down. It gained over 3,000 submissions. Soon after, a group of employees created a website and Medium page, on which Scarlett and Janneke Parrish, a program manager at Apple, posted anonymous reports of mistreatment, including verbal and sexual abuse, retaliation, discrimination, poor working conditions, and unequal pay experienced by Apple employees and contractors. Scarlett said the group received over 600 stories from employees. Parrish was later fired, and the group started more formally organizing as Apple Together, a solidarity union which Scarlett and Parrish helped found and as of May 2022, were advisors for. Organizers said that they are not being paid fairly for the work they are doing, and that many are struggling to survive. Scarlett asked The Washington Post, "If the richest company in the world won't pay its workers enough to live, who will?"

Apple has said that they trust in their "framework for the implementation and oversight of [Apple's] human rights commitments", and that they have "always strived to create an inclusive, welcoming workplace where everyone is respected and accepted".

Scarlett's allegations with the NLRB, along with other employee activism around D&I, prompted SOC Investment Group (SOC), Trillium Asset Management (TAM), and Service Employees International Union (SEIU) to introduce a shareholder proposal for a "civil-rights audit." The proposal cited diversity statistics, and alleged that the company's public philanthropy in racial justice is not reflected in the company's own workforce, writing, "It is unclear how Apple plans to address racial inequality in its workforce," and Scarlett said the company's "behavior is not reflective of the mission and values they portray to their shareholders and the public." She said charts she tweeted showed "alarming" trends, alleging "white men have much more opportunities to advance within the company, and are more likely to be working in technical roles". She said her coworkers wanted "a third-party investigation into salary data, or an audit that [employees] have insight into." Apple recommended shareholders vote against the proposal, but on March 4, 2022, shareholders voted in favor of the proposal for the first time in 10 years.

Apple has stated that they examine compensation annually and ensure that they maintain pay equity, that the company, through existing policies and practices, already meet the objectives of the civil-rights audit, and that "underrepresented communities represent nearly half of the U.S. workforce". The proposal was considered non-binding, but Apple agreed to follow through with the audit.

Also due to Scarlett's, Parrish's, and other Apple workers' charges over 2021 and 2022 with the NLRB against Apple, SOC, TAM, and SEIU introduced an additional shareholder proposal in September 2022 asking for a "workers' rights assessment."

==== Federal labor board charges ====
On September 1, 2021, Scarlett filed a charge with the National Labor Relations Board, alleging that Apple had violated the law in stopping employees from discussing their salaries and gathering data to examine racial or gender-based wage gaps.

Scarlett and the company reached a non-board settlement in November 2021, after nearly three months of what Scarlett referred to as "fighting" with the company in a tweet, which included a severance of one year's pay to be split with her attorneys, and withdrawal of the charge, under the condition that Apple make a "public, visible affirmation" that employees could freely discuss workplace conditions and pay. Scarlett tweeted that the affirmation was one of four demands she had sent to the company on September 2, 2021. In December, Scarlett said that Apple had not made changes to the settlement requested by the NLRB, and the withdrawal was subsequently denied by the agency. The company posted the stipulated notice, but only during the week of Thanksgiving, which Apple had given the entire company off. As a result, she said that Apple had not upheld the agreement, and she would not be making another request to withdraw the charge.

In January 2023, the NLRB determined 3 of Scarlett's charges had merit and charged Apple with unlawfully surveilling employees, suppressing worker organizing on social media, and hindering wage discussions in October 2024. The NLRB prosecutor also charged Apple with constructive dismissal, meaning that the company forced Scarlett to quit absent grounds for termination. The NLRB found that Apple told Scarlett to stop posting on social media about the company and pressured her to take medical leave. Participants in the survey were interrogated about their involvement with Scarlett and the wage survey, and according to the complaint, managers at Apple threatened participants in public activism and the wage survey with demotions. The NLRB also charged Apple with wrongful dismissal of Parrish, and for enforcing other unlawful rules, such as forcing employees to sign contracts with illegal NDAs, which Scarlett had been forced to sign as part of her departure.

==== Whistleblowing ====
Ifeoma Ozoma, a public policy specialist, along with the non-profit shareholder advocacy group Open MIC, and social impact investing firms Whistle Capital and Nia Impact Capital (Nia) filed a shareholder proposal at Apple on the use of concealment clauses. On October 25, 2021, Scarlett filed a whistleblower complaint with the SEC over Apple's statements in a no-action letter claiming that the company does not use non-disclosure agreements" (NDAs) in the context of harassment, discrimination, and other unlawful acts." Scarlett provided the SEC and, later, Nia, with the NDA that Apple had included as a part of a separation agreement, which she had refused to sign. In the complaint, Scarlett alleged that Apple had tried to stipulate that she describe her choice to "leav[e] the company [as] being a personal decision, rather than fleeing a hostile work environment". Apple's no-action request was subsequently denied by the SEC.

During the course of her settlement negotiations with Apple, Scarlett also asked for the company to add the language "Nothing in this agreement prevents you from discussing or disclosing information about unlawful acts in the workplace, such as harassment or discrimination or any other conduct that you have reason to believe is unlawful," which came from a law that would be effective in California a few months later in January 2022. The company refused at the time, but later said in a proxy statement to the SEC, which recommended that shareholders vote against the proposal, that it would add the language to all separation agreements in the United States. Shareholders voted to approve the proposal on March 4, 2022. In December 2022, Apple said the audit found limited instances where provisions would infringe on a person's ability to speak about unlawful conduct and agreed to remove all concealment clauses from all employment contracts. They also voluntarily committed to non-enforcement of previous restrictions.

Scarlett received one of five payments of a $213,000 severance package, and received notice Apple would not be paying her attorneys, or making future severance and COBRA payments, because she "repeatedly" breached her NDA. The letter also stated Apple was "preserving its right to seek liquidated damage for each separate breach", to which Scarlett said, "I don't have anything for them to take". In an essay for The Olympian, Scarlett, along with Gretchen Carlson and Julie Roginsky, who had both signed NDAs in settlements with Fox News, described a financial cost to speaking out and being driven from their careers and urged Washington to pass legislature making such NDAs illegal. Scarlett ran a GoFundMe campaign to pay her attorneys' fees.

After leaving Apple in November 2021, Scarlett accepted a position with the nonprofit Seattle Cancer Care Alliance. During her background screening, it was discovered that Apple had furnished her job title incorrectly as "associate" to Equifax's employment verification databases, causing a delay in her hiring, and eventually the job offer being rescinded. A lawyer, Laurie Burgess, said the practice of reporting false job titles, which it follows for all past employees, may be illegal. Scarlett filed a retaliation complaint with the SEC, which is reportedly being investigated, along with her previous tip, after eight state officials urged the agency to look into Scarlett's allegations.

=== 2021–present ===
Scarlett is on the Tech Worker Committee of The Solidarity Fund, an emergency fund for Apple and Netflix workers involved with organizing. The fund was created by Liz Fong-Jones and Coworker.org. Of the fund, Scarlett said, "There's a solidarity movement happening and there are hundreds of people from different parts of the company that are coming together to support the most vulnerable". In December 2021, Apple Together advertised the fund to encourage workers to strike in solidarity with workers at a retail store in Jacksonville, Florida. According to Jess Kutch, who co-founded Coworker.org, the call to action resulted in a real time increase of "significantly large" contributions from Apple employees.

In early 2022, Scarlett helped Starbucks baristas in the 2021–2022 unionization effort, partnering with Workers United (WU), a trade union affiliated with Service Employees International Union. While she was engaged in that effort, a Grand Central Terminal Apple retail employee reached out to her "distraught" after their union organizing committee had lost its partnership with their trade union. Scarlett connected the workers with her Starbucks WU contact, and on February 22, 2022, Fruit Stand Workers United voted to affiliate with WU. In April 2022, the workers went public with their organization effort to collect signatures to file for representation with the NLRB.

Scarlett joined game studio ControlZee in March 2022 to work on a game called dot big bang, a game creation platform that allows users to build multiplayer video games.

Scarlett was one of five expert researchers involved in a March 2022 Financial Times (FT) investigation into "Russia's Google", Yandex. Scarlett and the other researchers found that Yandex was harvesting and storing sensitive information such as a user's device fingerprint and IP address in Russia, which the Kremlin could legally demand access to. Yandex said the information obtained could "theoretically" be used by Russian officials to identify persons, but it would be "extremely hard". The team of researchers said that users of more than 52,000 applications, including applications like virtual private networks (VPNs) and secure messaging platforms launched during the 2022 Russian invasion of Ukraine, targeted at Ukrainians, would be unaware of the presence of Russian software because it was hidden in a software development kit (SDK) called AppMetrica, "piggybacking" on permissions granted to trusted applications. Scarlett said users were "trying to be proactive in being more safe, but actually making [themselves] more vulnerable". The research started with Zach Edwards, a researcher at the nonprofit organization Me2B Alliance, as part of an application audit campaign. Opera, which operates a mobile web browser of the same name, and some other application developers said they disabled the software and were working on removing it entirely. Google acknowledged they could be doing more to inform users about SDKs and agreed to conduct an investigation into the researchers' findings. Apple denied any SDKs could leech data without user knowledge.

=== Labor charges against Mozilla ===
In April 2022, The Washington Post reported that Scarlett believed she may have been turned down for positions at Mozilla and Epic Games due to her labor organizing at Apple. She filed charges with the NLRB against both companies. On November 22, 2023, the NLRB filed a charge against Mozilla for "failure to hire" of Scarlett. The prosecutors cited a series of tweets Scarlett made during the course of her interview and demanded the company hire Scarlett or pay incurred damages to "otherwise make her whole." The general counsel's office alleged that Mozilla rejected her "to discourage employees from engaging" in protected activities. On January 14, 2025, Mozilla settled the case with the NLRB. They agreed to pay $300,000 in lost wages and benefits to Scarlett and to post a notice informing employees of the settlement, their rights under the NLRA, and a promise not to retaliate.

=== Facial recognition software criticism ===
Scarlett has called for scrutiny and regulation of facial recognition software (FRS). In January 2022 Scarlett tweeted a photograph that Facebook's FRS had thought was her, but was really her great-great-great-grandmother, and indicated that such activities were dangerous and off-putting. Andrew Bosworth, the chief technology officer of Meta, and Jerome Pesenti, Meta's head of artificial intelligence, responded to Scarlett's tweet that the FRS had been turned off "a while back" and that they "never tagged people in random photos of people they weren't connected to".

A month later, Rachel Metz of CNN reached out to Scarlett about the tweet to discuss FRS, and directed Scarlett to PimEyes, a FRS website that allows users to search the internet for photos matching a face in an uploaded photo. Curious if the site would also give images of her relatives, Scarlett found some photos of her and matches to similar-looking individuals such as Britney Spears and Jamie Lynn Spears, but no photographs of any of her relatives. However, some of the photos of her turned out to be from a 2005 incident in which she was forced to perform sexual acts on camera. Despite an opt-out request being approved, Scarlett and Metz discovered that the images were not actually removed from the service. Scarlett filed complaints with the Washington State Attorney General's office in January 2023. After PimEyes removed more than 400 matching images, searches still found her images on the website.

A Vice News Tonight investigation found that PimEyes primary use was for stalking and warned it could be the end of privacy. The implications of Scarlett's experience with facial recognition software raised questions about privacy and control over one's own face. She called the technology leap to using a picture of someone's face to find out everything about them "Star Trek stuff."

== Select publications ==
- Carlson, Gretchen; Roginsky, Julie; Scarlett, Cher (February 6, 2022). "Washington can be a leader on protecting sexual harassment, assault survivors". The Olympian.
- Scarlett, Cher (March 12, 2019). "Creating A Spotify-Powered App Using Nuxt.js". Smashing Magazine.
- Scarlett, Cher (February 17, 2022). "A practical guide to mentoring (and being mentored)". Polywork.

== Legislation ==
=== Whistleblower protection ===
In 2021, Scarlett led efforts in Washington state to reform employer secrecy practices. She lobbied for legislation in her home state of Washington similar to the Silenced No More Act, a bill in California that prevents employers from silencing whistleblowers. After seeking advice from Ifeoma Ozoma, a former Pinterest public policy employee who had led California's advocacy, Scarlett worked with Senator Karen Keiser and House Representative Liz Berry on bills in the 2022 Washington State Legislature session. Scarlett and Chelsey Glasson, a former Google employee, testified in support of the house bill (HB 1795) they inspired, which was passed into law on March 3, 2022. It was effective with retroactive coverage as of June 9, 2022. Due to their secrecy reform work, Ozoma and Scarlett became leaders of tech accountability.

Google committed to Silenced No More protections for all employees following passage of the Washington legislation. Apple added the language to their employment contracts, after refusing to do so as part of Scarlett's separation agreement.

=== Wage transparency ===
In 2022, Scarlett lobbied for SB 5761, a bill that requires employers with 15 or more employees to post salary information on its job postings, including for internal transfers for existing employees. Scarlett had relocated while she was at Apple and requests for her new compensation were unanswered until after she moved. Scarlett testified in support of the bill on February 16, 2022, and spoke about her own wages being suppressed during her career because her past employers asked for her salary expectations, instead of sharing what the role paid. She said that underrepresented groups are often not in a position to negotiate, and the "veil of secrecy" around compensation results in wage gaps. The bill was passed into law on March 1, 2022. It is effective as of January 1, 2023.

=== Health data privacy ===
In 2023, Scarlett testified in favor of the My Health, My Data Act sponsored by Vandana Slatter. HB 1155, which was requested by Washington's Attorney General, Bob Ferguson, prohibits the collection and sharing of digital health data, or data that can be used to infer health status, without consent. It also prohibits identifying or tracking consumers around healthcare services. It was the first law in the nation of its kind. Scarlett said the bill was weakened after an amendment allowed businesses to track location data within a 1,750 foot radius without permission. The bill was signed by the governor in April, effective March 31, 2024.

== Personal life ==
Scarlett has Bipolar I disorder and ADHD.

Scarlett is active on Twitter, where she is known for her advocacy for marginalized groups.

== See also ==
- Timnit Gebru
- Chris Smalls
- Sophie Zhang
- Jaz Brisack
- Emma Kinema
