= Fallback =

Fallback may refer to:

- A contingency plan to be taken if the preferred choice is unavailable
- A signal of inferior quality in HD Radio
- Fallback font in graphic user interface and typesetting
- Fallback voting
- Fast Fallback, an IP networking technique
- A tactical withdrawal

== See also ==
- Fall back, a feature of a modem protocol
