= Janneke Parrish =

American workers' rights activist (born 1990/1)

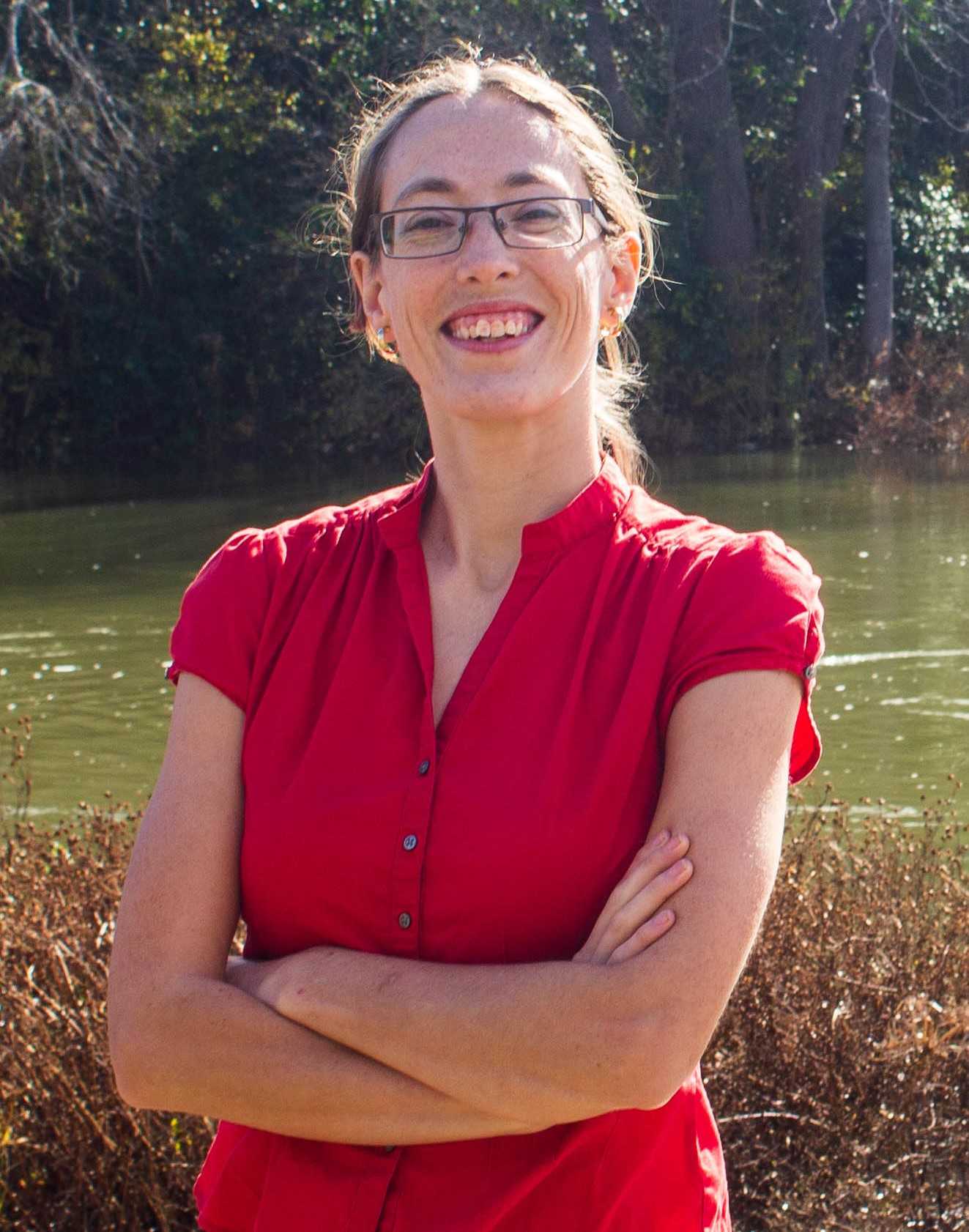
- Parrish in 2021
- Born: 1991 or 1992 (age 34–35); Pennsylvania, US
- Education: North Carolina State University; University of Glasgow
- Occupation: Program manager
- Known for: Workers' rights advocacy
- Movement: #AppleToo
- Website: jannekeparrish.com

Janneke Parrish (born 1990 or 1991) is an American program manager and workers' rights activist living in the Netherlands known for being a leader of the #AppleToo movement. Parrish was fired in 2021 for interfering with an investigation into a leak; in 2025, the National Labor Relations Board dismissed charges against Apple that Parrish had been fired illegally.

== Personal life and education ==
Parrish was born in Pennsylvania to an American father and Dutch mother, a nurse practitioner, who immigrated to the United States. Parrish lives in Sassenheim, in the Netherlands, to attend law school at Vrije Universiteit in Amsterdam.

Parrish attended Rosewood High School and the North Carolina School of Science and Mathematics. She then went on to attend North Carolina State University, where she received a Bachelor of Arts in philosophy and religious studies with a minor in Middle East studies. She also holds a Master of Science in Human Rights and International Politics from the University of Glasgow.

Parrish became an advocate for abortion rights after having an abortion at 19 in Raleigh, North Carolina. In 2022, a chain of tweets she wrote about her experiences with a miscarriage while on contraceptives in Texas went viral.

== Career at Apple and organizing ==
Parrish worked in Austin, Texas on the Apple Maps team for five years, first as a data analyst in 2015, and then as a program manager.

During the COVID-19 pandemic, Parrish participated in distributing multiple open letters asking Apple leadership to address various issues: remote work beyond the pandemic, allegations in the #AppleToo movement, and Apple's stance on restrictive abortion laws, namely the Texas Heartbeat Act. The #AppleToo movement gathered and shared stories of alleged discrimination, racism, sexism, and sexual misconduct at the company. Parrish helped Cher Scarlett organize the movement and together they published some of the stories on Medium, which gained national attention. Parrish performed analysis of the stories to create statistics that could track what the stories were about. She said that 40% of the stories described unequal treatment of people based on their gender. Some corporate workers involved in the organizing of #AppleToo, including Parrish, founded Apple Together, a solidarity union within Apple.

=== Suspension and firing ===
At an all-hands meeting in September 2021, Parrish and other #AppleToo organizers asked leadership to address questions about pay equity, remote work, vaccination rules, and options for employees in states with restrictive abortion laws. A recording from a company-wide meeting was leaked to the press on September 17, 2021, containing details about the answers to the activists' questions.

Parrish was placed under investigation for the leak and suspended. She was questioned over video conference, and shortly afterward, she said a courier arrived at her home to collect her company-owned devices. Prior to turning them over to the courier, Parrish deleted apps from the phone such as Pokémon Go, Robinhood, and Google Drive, which she said she was embarrassed about. She also deleted screenshots off of the computer she said were of innocuous things like programming bugs she was working on. She told The Verge in an interview that Apple encourages employees to use their work phones as their personal phones. Other employees, including program manager Ashley Gjøvik, also said this. Her personal phone was not confiscated. Parrish continued to post the digests after she was placed under investigation by Apple. Parrish was fired on October 14, 2021. Apple said she was terminated for "interfering with an investigation by deleting files on your company provided equipment after being specifically instructed not to do so." Parrish filed an unfair labor practice charge against Apple in November 2021, alleging that her firing was in response to her organizing. The charge alleged that the investigation and subsequent suspension and termination were "based upon false and pretextual reasons." Parrish said she did not leak any information.

On October 10, 2024, the NLRB charged Apple with illegally firing Parrish for advocating for workplace changes and for restricting its employees' use of social media and Slack in violation of the National Labor Relations Act of 1935. The prosecutor also charged Apple with constructive dismissal of Scarlett, and for unlawfully surveilling organizing workers, suppressing discussions of pay equity, and enforcing other unlawful rules.

On September 26, 2025, upon reconsideration by acting General Counsel William Cowen, the NLRB withdrew and dismissed the charges against Apple that Parrish had been terminated illegally; and other claims that employee rights were violated by Apple's conduct. The charges had originally been brought under Jennifer Abruzzo.

== See also ==
- Sexism in the technology industry
- Abortion-rights movements
- History of Apple Inc.
- Criticism of Apple Inc.
