= Tech bro =

Slang term in the tech industry

"Tech bro" (or "brogrammer") is a slang term for male individuals, often stereotypically masculine, working in the technology industry (particularly programming and Silicon Valley companies) who are perceived as arrogant or out of touch with broader society.

According to the Cambridge Dictionary, a tech bro is "someone, usually a man, who works in the digital technology industry, especially in the United States, and is sometimes thought to not have good social skills and to be too confident about their own ability." Similarly, Merriam-Webster defines the term as "a disapproving term for a man working in tech."

While originally used to describe a specific cultural phenomenon in the San Francisco Bay Area's tech scene, the term "tech bro" has evolved to become a broader criticism of the tech industry's culture and power dynamics. The terms are often used pejoratively to describe alleged toxic masculinity and sexism in the technology industry.

Some programmers self-describe themselves as a brogrammer (a portmanteau of bro and programmer) positively as a word for "sociable or outgoing programmer", and it also represents a subculture within the greater tech industry.

== Origin and evolution ==
Mark Zuckerberg

Jack Dorsey

The term emerged in the early 2010s to describe a specific archetype in San Francisco's technology sector: typically a young, white male employee working at a tech company, wearing distinctive attire often including a Patagonia fleece vest branded with his company's logo. An example sometimes cited of targeted advertising toward "brogrammers" is an early (before 2012) Klout hiring advert posted at a Stanford University career fair as "Want to bro down and crush some code? Klout is hiring." The company later described it as a joke and as an unfortunate misstep.

By the 2020s, the term had expanded to encompass a wider range of tech industry figures, including billionaire executives like Mark Zuckerberg and Jack Dorsey. Critics have noted that this expansion of the term has diluted its meaning, as it began to be applied to any male figure in tech who merited criticism, regardless of whether they displayed stereotypical "bro" characteristics.

Brogrammer culture has been said to have created an entry barrier based on adherence to the image presented by its participants, rather than ability. It is often viewed as antithetical to geek culture, which traditionally emphasized ability and passion for the field over image.

== Cultural impact ==
=== The "Bro Code" ===
The concept of a "Bro Code" has emerged to describe the values and behaviors that characterize tech bro culture. According to researchers, these values include "precision questioning, abstraction, aggression, sexism and a disdain for altruism" that create and perpetuate a hostile work environment, particularly for women and minorities.

The "Bro Code" is said to contribute to high tolerance of sexual harassment and the field's stark racial and gender segregation. For example, only 21 percent of computer programming positions are held by women, with even lower representation among African American women (2 percent) and Latina women (1 percent).

=== Criticism ===
Critics argue that using "tech bro" as an all-purpose epithet for problems in the technology industry can trivialize more systemic issues. Edelman notes that "the term tends to obscure and even trivialize more important concerns. It implies that the harms caused by technology platforms are attributable somehow to a character flaw, a certain level of personal impishness or immaturity, when in fact they are much more systemic."

Technology journalist Kara Swisher has criticized the industry's evolution, noting the "casual hypocrisy" that became "increasingly common" among tech leaders. In her book Burn Book, she wrote, "Over that time, I watched founders transform from young, idealistic strivers in a scrappy upstart industry into leaders of some of America's largest and most influential businesses. And while there were exceptions, the richer and more powerful they grew, the more compromised they became."

In a 2012 article in Gizmodo, Sam Biddle argued that the sexist effect of brogrammer culture had been overblown by the press. He did not deny that there are "brogrammers", rather he argued that "the brogrammer as phenomenon is mythology, a fairytale figure conjured up by the confused and outmoded to explain progress in an old and stodgy industry."

== Industry and policy influence ==
=== Political influence and Trump alignment ===
While Silicon Valley overall remains heavily Democratic with political contributions from the Internet industry tilted toward Democrats, some notable tech figures have exerted right-wing political influence. Economist Paul Krugman argued in 2024 that "right-wing tech bros are exerting a significant and... malign influence on the political landscape."

A notable example is billionaire Peter Thiel's backing of JD Vance's Senate campaign, which Krugman characterized as effectively buying Vance a Senate seat "by overwhelming his rivals with a flood of cash." The cryptocurrency industry has also become a major political donor, with Public Citizen reporting that "the crypto industry accounts for almost half the money contributed by corporations to political action committees so far in 2024." The 2024 United States presidential election accelerated the alignment between tech leaders and Donald Trump's MAGA movement. Elon Musk pledged over $200 million to Trump's campaign and was subsequently named co-lead of the Department of Government Efficiency (DOGE) in Trump's administration. Thiel's influence expanded with his protégé JD Vance becoming Vice President-elect, while other Thiel associates secured nominations for key government positions.

Even tech executives who had previously distanced themselves from Trump changed their approach after his 2024 election victory. Meta CEO Mark Zuckerberg, who had banned Trump from Facebook following the January 6 United States Capitol attack, announced in January 2025 that his platforms would be "dismantling fact-checking processes" and "prioritizing speech," acknowledging criticism that his sites had been "too politically biased." Other major tech leaders, including Apple's Tim Cook and OpenAI's Sam Altman, donated to Trump's 2025 inauguration fund.

Critics have raised concerns about this alignment between tech leadership and the Trump administration. Seattle Times columnist David Horsey argued that unlike earlier tech pioneers like Steve Jobs and Bill Gates who maintained independence and social conscience, this newer generation of tech leaders appeared "desperate to sell what little soul they have in order to appease Trump and keep themselves free from federal government oversight and regulation."

=== Regulatory concerns ===
The growing influence of tech bros in politics has raised questions about potential conflicts of interest and regulatory capture. Political commentators have noted that the tech industry's shift toward Trump appears motivated by a desire to avoid government oversight, particularly in emerging fields like artificial intelligence and cryptocurrency.

Casey Burgat, a professor of politics at George Washington University, described the situation as tech leaders "navigating a delicate balancing act: maintaining good relations with a government that has openly threatened their business models while mitigating potential regulatory or legislative crackdowns." He suggested that for figures like Musk, "aligning with Trump's government offers potential influence over regulatory policies that directly impact the tech and venture capital industries. They stand to benefit from a government willing to roll back antitrust enforcement, loosen content moderation rules, and deregulate key sectors like artificial intelligence, energy, and biotech." Horsey noted that having "seriously undermined democracy by pummeling traditional media and giving a massive megaphone to extremists and conspiracy theorists via social media, the libertarian tech titans are moving on to empower artificial intelligence with the potential to devastate the workforce, and rejigger human identity and purpose," arguing that this development provides "all the justification needed for the establishment of regulations to protect the public interest."

=== Anti-woke identity ===
By the 2020s, the tech bro identity evolved to incorporate an "anti-woke" stance focused on cultural grievances. According to Derek Robertson of Politico, this evolution is a move from traditional libertarianism centered on limited government to "a movement that's almost entirely centralized around cultural grievances... against the increasing presence of women in culture, the increasing domination of women in academia and corporate fields."

This cohort is characterized by identifying as "free thinkers" while expressing alienation from mainstream liberal discourse. They often follow influential Silicon Valley executives and podcasters like Joe Rogan, and express concerns about "wokeness", vaccines, and the mainstreaming of transgender rights. Some of this philosophy has been attributed to the influence of Thiel, who "has for years funded a right-wing culture movement...that includes film festivals, conferences, and media companies that tout anti-feminism and climate change denialism."

== Effects on diversity in technology ==
In a 2015 interview, Megan Smith, top policy advisor on technology to U.S. President Barack Obama, identified brogrammer culture as a contributing factor to the lack of diversity in tech companies. Smith noted that despite promises from tech companies to improve their hiring of women, "only those that make it a top priority will see progress."

Research has shown that women are disproportionately affected during industry downsizing, with nearly 70 percent of those laid off in the 2022 tech layoffs being women. According to one researcher's experience, "As soon as the company went public, stockholders demanded annual layoffs. For the first two years, the only people terminated in my department were women."

== Activism and resistance ==
Worker activism against tech bro culture has increased since the late 2010s. In 2018, more than 20,000 Google employees across the globe staged a walkout against sexual harassment and systemic racism in the company. Industry observers predict that "activism against the militarization, racism, sexism and economic exploitation in the tech industry will skyrocket" as coalitions form between feminist movements, minorities, and labor activists.

In 2023, tech bros were reported to have "mobbed" the Grace Hopper Celebration, the world's largest conference for women and nonbinary tech workers. Women attendees described men at the career expo "simply barging in front of them in lines," with some reporting verbal harassment and assault.
