= Assessment culture =

Assessment culture is a subset of organizational culture in higher education characterized by trusting relationships, data-informed decision-making, a respect for the profession of teaching, and an internally-driven thirst for discovery about student learning. Positive assessment culture generally connotes the existence of conditions for collaboration among practitioners, reward structures, professional development opportunities for faculty and staff, student involvement, and a shared commitment among leaders to making institutional improvements that are sustainable.

Assessment culture may be revealed behaviorally through factors such as: celebration of successes, comprehensive program review, shared use of common terminology and language, provision of technical support, and use of affirmative messaging to effectively convey meaning. The culture of assessment has been measured by scholars of perceptions among faculty to determine motivations, sense of support, and levels of fear related to assessment.

== See also ==
- Fail fast (business)
