= Second-generation gender bias =

Psychological misogyny and abuse

Second-generation gender bias refers to a type of gender bias that may seem neutral or not explicitly sexist on the surface, yet still disadvantages women by reflecting the values and norms established by men who historically shaped the environment, particularly in the workplace. It is contrasted with first-generation bias, which is deliberate, usually involving intentional exclusion.

A notable example of second-generation gender bias is the expectation that leaders should be assertive. As a result, women who adopt a more collaborative leadership style are often not perceived as effective leaders, while those who demonstrate assertiveness may be regarded as overly aggressive. This kind of bias, or gender stereotyping, can be entirely unconscious.

== First- and second-generation bias ==
First-generation bias came from practices that were once legally permitted. With legislative reforms that now prohibit gender discrimination, second-generation bias has emerged as a more subtle form of discrimination rooted in unconscious attitudes and embedded in organizational norms and patriarchal structures. As Harvard Business School professor Robin Ely argues, this underlying bias helps explain the persistence of the glass ceiling and the ongoing lack of progress toward gender parity in corporate boardrooms, senior management, and the workforce at large. Despite the passing of a half century since the modern social movement for women's rights began, many of the same public gender gaps persist. According to the Korn Ferry Institute, "By 2015, one might have expected significant leaps forward in corporate gender diversity. But the numbers don't lie, and the barriers, both overt and subtle, seem to be stuck in place."

Due to the subtle and unintentional nature of second-generation gender bias, women may deny or be unaware of the barriers to the same social rewards and opportunities men seem to have in obtaining management and leadership positions in all aspects of social and political life from education to business to politics in any patriarchal society. It can also lead people to de-legitimize constructive debates about gender disparities. A significant cost of second-generation gender bias is that previously successful junior level women may experience identity threat as they move up the ladder of success and face the need to re-situate their identity roles in positive and negative ways. All of these make the struggle for gender equality seem more psychological and stressful as if the barrier is solely created in their own minds.

== Workplace discrimination ==
Second-generation gender bias is a form of discrimination against women because their practices reflect the values of the men who created the setting, which is often the workplace. Gender bias is one of the most regularly appearing biases shown in the workplace, as opposed to racist bias or personal bias. Few people in workplaces with gender diversity recognize it as a problem, and many people, including those who work in single-gender workplaces, are not aware it is happening at all. An example of second-generation gender bias is that in some work places, women are not being hired because the company is a male-dominated workplace. Work cultures may be structured to appear to be neutral and unbiased, yet they can still reflect subtle biases or norms that influence workplace dynamics.

Faye Crosby argues that second-generation gender bias goes unnoticed in the workplace, not only by men but also by women. Many women experience second-generation gender bias in the workplace, but fail to notice that such discrimination is happening. Women who do recognize second-generation gender bias may feel more power-driven, rather than taken advantage of, when thinking of the discriminatory acts that they have experienced in the past. According to Herminia Ibarra, women who recognize these discriminatory acts feel empowered to take action to counter those effects by pushing themselves to achieve leadership opportunities they are qualified for, seeking out sponsors and supporters, and negotiating their work arrangements. Masculine traits, such as strength, confidence, and definitive, are typically preferred in the workplace because they make the company appear to be more driven and confident in its success. However, when a woman exhibits these traditionally masculine traits, she is frequently perceived as bossy, impolite, or arrogant. Experts say that men may be more inclined toward natural leadership due to biological predispositions. Women can be effective leaders due to their capacity for compassion toward team members, which may contribute to stronger interpersonal relationships and enhanced team cohesion. While women are enrolling in college and earning degrees at historically high rates, data indicate that they are not progressing in education at the same pace as men. There has been an increase in the number of women earning doctorates; however, this growth is not reflected in the proportion of women advancing to professorial roles or attaining senior leadership positions, such as university president. Many people believe that discrimination ended in the mid-1960s; however, efforts to combat discrimination have continued beyond that period. Sandra Bem (1981) made known the gender schema theory, which explains how an individual's sex identity is essential to the culture in which one is brought up. These ideas are still interfering with women advancing in society. Meyerson and Fletcher (2000) propose that gender discrimination will never go away, it has just "gone underground."

The main difference between first-generation gender bias and second-generation gender bias is whether or not it is intentional. In first-generation gender bias, one intentionally discriminates against another, whereas in second-generation gender bias, the discrimination is not intentional.

The Harvard Business Review documented reports from women in the workplace who suggested that organizational practices and policies were holding them back:

My firm has the very best intentions when it comes to women. But it seems every time a leadership role opens up, women are not on the slate. The claim is made that they just can't find women with the right skill set and experience.

It is exactly because second-generation bias is not intentional and not directly harmful that causes it to be pernicious. It leads to discomfort, disconnection from male colleagues and superiors, and often creates a context for exclusion in which women feel unwelcome and uneasy about their social position and access to greater remuneration compared to their male colleagues.

== Examples of second-generation gender bias in the workplace ==
Bias in Engineering is a specific example of second-generation bias is how in some places, companies are having trouble keeping women engineers as employees. These women are not staying in their field because of their low self-esteem in regards to failing in front of their mostly male counterparts. These women may feel intimidated and outnumbered by the males in the workplace, causing them to fear failing while being watched by an audience that is majority male-dominant. If there wasn't such discrimination in the workplace regarding women in charge and working in a place full of men, studies show that women would not have such low self-esteem, and they would possibly continue to try their best to succeed in their field. This behavior of women is sometimes unconscious and is caused because of this second-generation gender bias.

Bias in Law The law favours characteristics associated with masculinity such as long working hours and inflexible working patterns; plus male networking opportunities (such as golf and male-exclusive dinners/ drinks) where men are able to make connections and fraternal contacts. Long working hours mean that legal professionals are expected to be workaholic and this does not factor in that women often have more caring responsibilities than men; where women undertake family responsibilities it can be seen as a lack of commitment to work.

Where women cannot adhere to masculine expectations, or network through male events, this can affect career progression. Statistics from 2015 show that although 50% of women are now solicitors, only 22% of partners in the top 100 law firms are women. Female lawyers are also often over-represented in areas such as legal aid work, family law and sexual offences prosecutions. This could be because these areas are made more accessible to women.

== Gender bias in education ==
Second-generation gender bias refers to subtle and unintentional forms of bias that occur in institutional settings such as schools and universities. In educational environments, this type of bias can appear through gender stereotypes, classroom microaggressions, and evaluation biases. These biases are difficult to detect due to persistent descriptive stereotypes and existing gender imbalances in certain academic fields. For example, many science, technology, engineering, and mathematics (STEM) departments are typically male-dominated, with a higher proportion of male students and instructors compared to female representation. The low representation of women signifies a gender imbalance in certain academic fields, which can influence how competence and performance are perceived.

For instance, research experiments on evaluation bias have demonstrated that identical work may be judged differently depending on the perceived gender of the individual. The Goldberg paradigm, a randomized experiment conducted by Philip Goldberg in 1968, showed that evaluators rated an individual's work more favorably when it was associated with a male name compared to a female name. This illustrates how implicit bias can affect human judgments even when the quality of work is similar. Subsequent research suggests that differences in how success is attributed to different genders can contribute to implicit gender bias. Achievements by men are more likely to be linked to natural talent or skill, while achievements by women are attributed to luck or extreme effort.

Gender bias has also been observed in student evaluations of instructors. An experimental research has shown that the gender of an instructor can influence how students assess teaching performance, with female instructors receiving lower evaluation scores than male instructors despite similar levels of effectiveness. These differences are especially noticeable in academic departments where women remain underrepresented. Some patterns of gender bias come from cultural expectations and student backgrounds. For example, a study has found that students would rate instructors differently based on perceived cultural similarity. Students showed a tendency to evaluate instructors more favorably when they shared similar backgrounds.

== Gender bias in household labor ==
Second-generation bias can be observed in the division of household labor. Women are traditionally assigned household responsibilities such as cooking, cleaning, and childcare. These tasks are typically time-consuming and occur on a daily basis. However, men are more likely to handle occasional tasks such as home repair and yard work. The unequal distribution of labor within households can affect how individuals balance between work and home responsibilities.

In a study examining whether household labor imbalances cause work-family conflict, researchers found that women carry twice the domestic responsibility as men. Despite women spending more time doing household chores, the perceptions of fairness vary between different individuals. Women with an equal gender ideology would perceive this imbalance as unequal, but those with more traditional views are more likely to find the division acceptable and remain satisfied in their relationships.

The term "the second shift" was coined by Arlie Russell Hochschild, which explains how women are expected to do additional unpaid labor after a long day at work. The second shift highlights the challenges of balancing between professional and home obligations. The amount of time devoted to these responsibilities can reduce opportunities to rest or develop skills for career advancement. This phenomenon connects with how gendered expectations contribute to patterns of inequality in the workplace and at home.

== Possible solutions ==
Ending this second-generation gender bias is hard because men and women alike do not realize discrimination is taking place, or deny that it is occurring. Because this problem is overlooked so frequently, it is not recognized as a major problem in many workplaces. One example of a solution could be as easy as using initials instead of a full name to hide gender bias when applying for employment in the workplace. Although this would not change the bias entirely, it would make employers review the resumes without paying attention to gender. Budden et al. (2007) proved that when women were judged by their work blindly, the number of women hired increased. Another easy solution would be to have employees come together and list the biases to create better understanding of the biases taking place. This would allow women to focus less on how they might be being judged by others, and focus more on being good employees and leaders.

== See also ==
- Covert racism
- Racial color blindness
