= Organizational culture =

Customary behaviours in an organization

Organizational culture is the set of shared normalities, values, and behaviors in organizations that reflect an organization's core values and strategic direction. This concept is also referred to as business culture, corporate culture or company culture. The term corporate culture emerged in the late 1980s and early 1990s. (Note: Unlike many expressions that emerge in business jargon, the term spread to newspapers and magazines. Few usage experts object to the term. Over 80 percent of usage experts accept the sentence "The new management style is a reversal of GE's traditional corporate culture, in which virtually everything the company does is measured in some form and filed away somewhere.") It was initially used by managers, sociologists, and organizational theorists during the 1980s.

Organizational culture influences how people interact, how decisions are made (or avoided), the context within which cultural artifacts are created, employee attachment, the organization's competitive advantage, and the internal alignment of its units. It is distinct from the national culture or the broader cultural background of its workforce.

A related topic, organizational identity, refers to statements and images that are important to an organization and help to differentiate it from other organizations. An organization may also have its own management philosophy. Organizational identity influences all stakeholders, leaders and employees alike.

== Definition ==
Various definitions exist, without consensus. Lesley Willcoxson and Bruce Millett note that organizational cultures can be described in similar ways to wider forms of culture, such as national culture. Some of the definitions offered include:

- Writers Terrence E. Deal and Allan A. Kennedy defined organizational culture as "the way things get done around here".
- According to Elliott Jaques, the culture of a factory "is its customary and traditional way of thinking and doing of things, which is shared to a greater or lesser degree by all its members, and which new members must learn, and at least partially accept, in order to be accepted into service in the firm".
- Edgar Schein defined it as including a shared "pattern of basic assumptions" that group members acquired over time as they learn to cope with internal and external organizationally relevant problems.
- Ravasi and Schultz characterized it as a set of shared assumptions that guide behaviors. It is also the pattern of such collective behaviors and assumptions that are taught to new organizational members as a way of perceiving, thinking, and feeling.
- Schein, Deal, Kennedy, and Kotter advanced the idea that cultures are diverse and may encompass subcultures linked to individual management teams.
- Ravasi and Schultz and Allaire and Firsirotu claim that organizational culture represents the collective values, beliefs and principles of organizational members. It is influenced by factors such as history, type of product, market, technology, strategy, type of employees, management style, and national culture. Culture includes the organization's vision, values, norms, systems, symbols, language, assumptions, environment, location, beliefs and habits. Gallup reported that just 22% of U.S. employees feel connected to their organization's culture.
- Geert Hofstede defined organizational culture as "the collective programming of the mind which distinguishes the members of one organization from another".
- McHale defines culture as "how the organization functions and its deeply embedded patterns".

== History ==
Elliott Jaques introduced the concept in his 1951 book The Changing Culture of a Factory. The book was a published report of "a case study of developments in the social life of one industrial community between April 1948 and November 1950". The case involved a publicly-held British company engaged principally in the manufacture, sale, and servicing of metal bearings. The study concerned itself with the description, analysis, and development of corporate group behaviors.

== Analysis ==
Researchers have proposed various dimensions individually and in combination as useful for analyzing organizational culture. Examples include external/internal, strong/weak, flexible/rigid, and many others.

=== Insularity ===
Culture can be externally focused, aiming to satisfy customers, investors, and partners. Alternatively, they can be internally focused, aiming to satisfy employees, comply with union-imposed rules, or meet conduct standards around issues such as diversity, equity, and inclusion. Many organizations lie between such extremes, attempting to balance the needs of multiple stakeholders.

=== Strength ===
Any type of culture can be strongly or only tacitly supported. A strong culture is characterized by reinforcing tools such as ceremonies and policies to instill and spread it. The intent is to secure group compliance.

Researchers generally report that organizations with strong cultures are more successful.

An employee's perception of the organization's culture can have an impact on the employee's longevity with the organization. When organizations create a positive environment for their employees, they experience professional fulfillment, boosted performance, and a longer stint with the organization.

=== Risks ===
Tension arises when cultural (personal) and organizational identities do not match well because corporate policies, work practices, and communication styles conflict with local customs, for example, in terms of formal vs. informal work environments, direct vs. indirect communication, and individualistic vs. collectivist approaches.

Quiet quitting is a principle that could potentially affect organizations with negative culture. It is the idea of doing the bare minimum on a job and setting boundaries in response to poor culture, burnout, lack of recognition, and inadequate work-life balance. This occurs in unhealthy work environments where personal circumstances force employees to stay.

=== Cultural ===
Organizational culture is used to control, coordinate, and integrate distinct groups across the organization. Differences in national cultures must be addressed. Such differences include organizational structure and manager/employee relationships.

=== Groupthink ===
Irving Janis defined groupthink as "a mode of thinking that people engage in when they are deeply involved in a cohesive in-group, when the members' strivings for unanimity override their motivation to realistically appraise alternative courses of action." This is a state in which even if group members have different ideas, they do not challenge the group. Groupthink can lead to a lack of creativity and decisions made without critical evaluation. Hogg and separately Deanne et al. stated that groupthink can occur, for example, when group members rely heavily on a charismatic figure or when members evince an "evangelical" belief in the organization's values. Groupthink can also occur in groups characterized by a friendly climate conducive to conflict avoidance.

==== Five Monkeys Experiment ====
Since the late 1960s, the so-called "Five Monkeys Experiment", which serves to exemplify the adverse effects of unquestioned traditions, has become part of management lore, often titled "How Company Policy Is Made". It imagines a situation where five monkeys are in a cage with a banana tied to the ceiling. Whenever a monkey climbs to reach the banana, all five are sprayed with cold water. The group quickly learn to ignore the banana and punish any monkey who attempts to reach for it. If one monkey is removed from the cage and replaced with a newcomer, they too are punished for reaching for the banana. If every monkey is subsequently replaced in this manner, so that none present remember being sprayed with cold water, the group will supposedly continue to punish any attempts to reach the banana. The monkeys are perpetuating a caution that may be redundant, "because that's the way it's always been around here".

=== Rigidity and adaptability ===
Willcoxson and Millett note that organizational cultures change over time. Kotter and Heskett define an adaptive culture as characterized by managers who pay close attention to their constituencies, especially customers, initiating change when needed, and taking risks. They claim that organizations with adaptive cultures perform better.

=== Bullying ===
Bullying manifests in workplaces that allow employees of higher status to harass those of lower status. This generally requires support or at least forbearance from company leaders. Bullying can cascade down the organizational hierarchy as supervisors experiencing bullying display the same behavior to their subordinates.

Workplace bullying impacts employees, leading to increased stress on the job, decreased productivity and high turnover rates. Employees who are bullied often remain silent because management fails to hold perpetrators accountable.

=== COVID-19 impact ===
The pandemic led many organizations to incorporate limiting spread into their cultures as a collective responsibility. Responses focused on requiring vaccines, hygiene, and masking.

In Asia, mask-wearing was part of several national cultures predating the pandemic. This was driven by experience with prior flus in Asia, such as Spanish flu, Hong Kong flu, Avian flu, and Swine flu, in addition to SARS, as well as various affronts to air quality such as volcanic eruptions.

Somers categorized cultures based on whether the needs of the individual or the group were foremost. He used behaviors such as mask-wearing to measure collectivism vs individualism. Cultures otherwise rated "strong" were relatively resistant to change during the pandemic. However, strong cultures that emphasized innovation were more willing to change.

Mandated interventions could be seen by members either as attempts to protect them or as attempts to exert control despite limited effectiveness, depending on how they were presented.

Digital tools such as videoconferencing, screen-sharing, file sharing, shared document authoring, digital whiteboards, and chat groups became widely accepted, replacing in-person meetings. The reduced amount of face-to-face communications may have impacted organizational cultures. New members, lacking face time with others, experienced difficulty in adapting to their organization's culture. The loss of face time affected existing employees as well, directly weakening cultures, in addition to the indirect effects that strengthened or weakened cultures as organizations reacted in various ways to the pandemic. Some members felt disengaged and expendable rather than essential, alienated, and exhausted.

Sull and Sull reported that employees rated their leadership higher, given honest/open communication, integrity, and transparency, more than in preceding years. Also, employers and leaders giving more attention to employees' welfare had a positive impact on cultural adherence. Chambers claimed that this was a short-term response rather than a culture change.

Deloitte argued that employees displayed a greater sense of purpose, inspiration, and contribution. Also, leaders became more tolerant of employees' failure because of a significant increase in experimentation and risk-taking.

Daum and Maraist claimed that a sense of purpose relates to customers and the society in which employees are part. They compared hospitals and retail shops. The former had a greater sense of purpose during the pandemic, while the latter had less.

== Indicators ==
Healthy cultures address members' concerns about the well-being of the organization. Whistleblowing, particularly when it damages a company's reputation, is considered to be a sign of a dysfunctional corporate culture, indicating that internal methods of addressing problems are inadequate.

== Intended effects ==
Numerous outcomes have been associated either directly or indirectly with organizational culture. The relationships between organizational culture and various outcomes include organizational performance, employee commitment, and innovation. A strong organizational culture is associated with various outcomes, including:

- Improved performance through innovation and customer service
- Consistent efficient employee performance
- Team cohesiveness
- High employee morale and job satisfaction
- Alignment towards goal achievement
- Increased member conscientiousness, leading to better compliance with procedures such as information security, and workplace safety

A Harvard Business School study reported that culture has a significant effect on an organization's long-term economic performance. The study examined the management practices at 160 organizations over ten years and found that culture can impact performance. Performance-oriented cultures experienced better financial results. Additionally, a 2002 Corporate Leadership Council study found that cultural traits such as risk-taking, internal communications, and flexibility are important drivers of performance. Furthermore, innovativeness, productivity through people, and other cultural factors cited by Peters and Waterman in In Search of Excellence also have positive economic consequences.

Denison, Haaland, and Goelzer reported that culture contributes to the success of the organization, but not all dimensions contribute equally. Effects differed across nations, implying that organizational culture is rooted in national culture.

== Culture change ==
Cultures are not static and can evolve over time, either organically or through intentional change efforts by management. Culture change may be attempted to reduce member turnover, influence behavior, make improvements to the organization, reset objectives, rescale the organization, or achieve specific results.

=== Stages ===
Organizational cultures have been reported to change in stages. Organizational communication professor Dave Logan proposed five stages:

- "Life sucks" (a subsystem severed from other functional systems, such as a tribe, gang or prison—2 percent of the population);
- "My life sucks" (—25 percent of population);
- "I'm great, and you're not" (—48 percent of population);
- "We are great, but other groups suck" (unification around more than individual competence—22 percent of population) and
- "Life is great" (3 percent of the population).

=== Obstacles ===
Existing culture can hinder change efforts, especially where members understand the roles that they are supposed to play. Marquis et al. claimed that 70% of all change efforts fail because of the members. Organizational culture, and the structures in which they are embedded, often exhibit substantial inertia.

=== Methods ===
Change methodologies include Peter Senge's concept of a "learning organization" expressed in The Fifth Discipline or Directive Communication's "corporate culture evolution".

Prior to introducing a cultural change, a needs assessment can characterize the existing culture. This involves some mixture of employee surveys, interviews, focus groups, observation, customer surveys, and other internal research. The company must then describe the new, desired culture, and design a change process.

Cummings and Worley offer six guidelines for cultural change, in line with the eight distinct stages mentioned by Kotter.

- Formulate a strategic vision (Kotter stages 1, 2, and 3). A clear vision of the firm's new strategy, shared values and behaviors provides direction for the culture change.
- Display top-management commitment (stage 4). Culture change must be managed from the top of the organization, as senior management's willingness to change is an important indicator. Leadership must be strongly in favor of the change to implement the change. De Caluwé and Vermaak provide a framework with five different ways of thinking about change.
- Model change at the highest level (stage 5). In order to show that management wants the change, the change has to be visible and notable. Leadership needs to express the values and behaviors to be realized. It is important that leadership acknowledge the strengths of the current culture; it must be made clear that the culture needs adjustments rather than radical changes. This process may include creating committees, task forces, or value managers. Change agents communicate the new culture. They must embody courage, flexibility, interpersonal skills, organization knowledge, and patience. These individuals must be catalysts, rather than dictators.
- The fourth step is to modify the organization to support change. This includes identifying systems, policies, procedures and rules accordingly. This may include changes to accountability systems, compensation, benefits/reward structures, and recruitment and retention programs.
- Select and socialize newcomers and expel deviants (stages 7 and 8). A way to implement a change is to connect it to organizational membership. People may have to be selected and terminated in terms of their fit with the new culture. Encouraging employee motivation and loyalty is key and creates a healthy culture. Change managers must be able to connect the desired behavior and organizational success. Training must be provided to employees.
- Develop ethical and legal sensitivity. Changes in culture can lead to tensions between organizational and individual interests, which can create legal problems for practitioners. This is particularly relevant for changes in integrity, control, equitable treatment and job security. An evaluation process monitors progress and identifies areas that need further development. This step surfaces obstacles and resistant members, and acknowledges and rewards improvement, which encourages change. It may be necessary to incorporate new change managers, such as outside consultants. People often resist change, leaving it to leadership to convince people that gains outweigh losses. Besides institutionalization, reification is another process that tends to occur in strong cultures. The organization may come to be regarded as a source of pride, and even unique. The organization's members develop a strong bond that transcends material returns, and begin to identify with it, turning the organization into a sort of clan.

== Critical views ==
Criticism of "organizational culture" began in the early 1980s. Most criticism comes from writers in critical management studies who, for example, express skepticism about functionalist and unitarist views. They stress how these assumptions can stifle dissent and reproduce propaganda and ideology. They suggest that organizations do not embody a single culture (diversity), and cultural engineering may not reflect the interests of all stakeholders.

Parker suggested that many of the assumptions surrounding organizational culture are not new. They reflect a long-standing tension between cultural and structural (or informal and formal) versions of organizations. Further, it is reasonable to suggest that complex organizations might have many cultures, and that such subcultures might overlap and contradict each other. The neat typologies of cultural forms found in textbooks rarely acknowledge such complexities, or the various economic contradictions that exist in capitalist organizations.

Smircich criticized theories that attempt to categorize or 'pigeonhole' organizational culture. She applied the metaphor of a plant root to represent culture, saying that it drives organizations rather than vice versa. Organizations are the product of their organizational culture, which shapes behavior and interaction. While Schein's underlying assumptions are that beliefs, perceptions, thoughts, and feelings are taken for granted and can be observed and considered the ultimate source of values and action. However, such assumptions undermine attempts to categorize and define organizational culture.

=== Legal liability ===
In the US, corporate culture can legally be found to be a cause of injuries and a reason for fining companies, such as when the US Department of Labor Mine Safety and Health Administration levied a fine of more than US$10.8 million on Performance Coal Co. following the Upper Big Branch Mine disaster in April 2010. This was the largest fine in the history of this agency.

=== Subcultures ===
Groups within the organization may act according to their own subcultures that are not fully aligned with those of the organization as a whole. For example, computer technicians will have expertise, language and behaviors gained independently of the organization, but their presence can influence the culture of the larger organization.

=== Shadow side ===
Egan and Tate speak of organizations having a "shadow side", which Egan defined as:

All those things that substantially and consistently affect the productivity and quality of the working life of a business, for better or worse, but which are not found on organisation charts, in company manuals, or in the discussions that take place in formal meetings.

Tate describes the shadow side as the "often disagreeable, messy, crazy and opaque aspects of [an] organisation's personality".

== See also ==
- Assessment culture
- Confirmation bias – Bias confirming existing attitudes
  - Belief perseverance – Maintenance of a belief despite new information that firmly contradicts it
- Cultural capital – Concept of social status and social mobility
- Cultural identity – Identity or feeling of belonging to a group
- Corporate DNA – Factors underlying and affecting organizational culture
- Diversity – Concept in sociology and political studies
- Fail fast (business) – Business management concept
- Gareth Morgan (business theorist) – British/Canadian organizational theorist (born 1943)
- Inclusive business
- Inclusiveness – Form of social disadvantage and relegation to the fringe of society
- Kick the cat – Metaphor about frustration within an organization
- Kiss up kick down – Form of social malfunction
- Lifestyle (sociology) – Way or style of living
- Machiavellianism in the workplace – Concept in organizational psychology
- Multiculturalism – Existence of multiple, distinct cultures within a single country
- Narcissism in the workplace – Problem producing an impact on an organization
- Organizational behavior – Study of human behavior in organizational settings
- Organizational dissent
- Organizational learning – Academic discipline; examines how goal-driven social entities add and create knowledge
- Organizational psychology – Branch of psychology
- Organizational studies – Academic field
- Overwork – Excessive work
- Power (social and political) – Ability to influence the behaviour of others
- People Operations – Organization's workforce
- Precarious work – Type of non-standard or temporary employment
- Psychological capital
- Psychopathy in the workplace – Prevalence of psychopathy in organizations
- Realistic job preview
- Silicon Valley culture – Technology hub in California, United States
- Three circles model
- Tick-box culture – Bureaucratic and external impositions on professional working conditions
- Working class culture – Culture and life of wage workers
- Workplace diversity – Aspects of a multicultural organization
- Presenteeism – Act or culture of working while sick
- Occupational safety and health – Field concerned with the safety, health and welfare of people at work

== Sources ==
- Adkins, B.; Caldwell, D. (2004). "Firm or subgroup culture: Where does fitting in matter most?". Journal of Organizational Behavior. 25 (8): 969–978. doi:10.1002/job.291.
- Burman, R.; Evans, A.J. (2008). "Target Zero: A Culture of safety" (PDF). Defence Aviation Safety Centre Journal. pp. 22–27. Archived from the original (PDF) on 2008-05-14.
- Cameron, Kim S.; Quinn, Robert E. (1999). Diagnosing and changing organizational culture: based on the competing values framework. Addison-Wesley series on organization development. Reading, Mass.: Addison-Wesley. ISBN 978-0-201-33871-3.
- Chatman, Jennifer A.; Jehn, Karen A. (June 1994). "Assessing the Relationship between Industry Characteristics and Organizational Culture: How Different can You Be?". Academy of Management Journal. 37 (3): 522–553. doi:10.5465/256699 (inactive 12 July 2025). JSTOR 256699. ProQuest 199853245.
- Cummings, Thomas; Worley, Christopher G. (2004). "Organization Development and Change". Dynamics of Organizational Change and Learning. pp. 25–42. doi:10.1002/9780470753408.ch2. ISBN 978-0-471-87737-0.
- Denison, Daniel (1990-01-16). Corporate Culture and Organizational Effectiveness. Wiley. ISBN 978-0-471-80021-7.
- Denison, Daniel R.; Haaland, Stephanie; Goelzer, Paulo (February 2004). "Corporate Culture and Organizational Effectiveness". Organizational Dynamics. 33 (1): 98–109. doi:10.1016/j.orgdyn.2003.11.008.
- Handy, Charles B. (1976). Understanding Organizations. Oxford University Press. ISBN 978-0-19-508732-1.
- Harris, Stanley G (1994). "Organizational Culture and Individual Sensemaking: A Schema-Based Perspective". Organization Science. 5 (3): 309–321. doi:10.1287/orsc.5.3.309.
- Harrison, Roger (1972) Understanding your organisation's character, Harvard Business Review
- Hofstede, Geert (1984). Culture's Consequences: International Differences in Work-Related Values. SAGE. ISBN 978-0-8039-1306-6.
- Hofstede, Geert; Hofstede, Gert Jan (2004-10-03). Cultures and Organizations: Software for the Mind. McGraw Hill Professional. ISBN 978-0-07-150568-0.
- Johnson, Gerry (1988). "Rethinking Incrementalism". Strategic Management Journal. 9: 75–91. doi:10.1002/smj.4250090107.
- Keick, Karl E. (September 1985). "Cosmos vs. chaos: Sense and nonsense in electronic contexts". Organizational Dynamics. 14 (2): 51–64. doi:10.1016/0090-2616(85)90036-1.
- Kotter, J. P. (1995). "Leading change: why transformation efforts fail". Harvard Business Review (73): 59–67.
- Schall, Maryan S. (1983). "A Communication-Rules Approach to Organizational Culture". Administrative Science Quarterly. 28 (4): 557–581. doi:10.2307/2393009. JSTOR 2393009.
- McGuire, Stephen J.J. Entrepreneurial organizational culture: Construct definition and instrument development and validation (Thesis).
- Mulder, Mauk (1977). The daily power game. doi:10.1007/978-1-4684-6951-6. ISBN 978-1-4684-6953-0.
- O'Rielly, Chatman; Caldwell (1991). "People and organizational culture: A profile comparison approach to assessing person-organization fit". Academy of Management Journal. 34 (3): 487–516. Bibcode:1991AManJ..34..487O. JSTOR 256404.
- Parker, M. (2000). Organizational Culture and Identity. London: Sage.
- Parsons, Talcott; Shils, Edward (1964-12-01). Toward a General Theory of Action: Theoretical Foundations for the Social Sciences. Transaction Publishers. ISBN 978-0-7658-0718-2.
- Peters; Waterman (1982). In Search of Excellence. New York: Harper & Row.
- Sathe, Vijay (September 1983). "Implications of corporate culture: A manager's guide to action". Organizational Dynamics. 12 (2): 5–23. doi:10.1016/0090-2616(83)90030-X. PMID 10264413.
- Stoykov, Lubomir (1995). Фирмената култура и комуникация [Company culture and communication] (in Bulgarian). Sofia: Stopanstvo.
- Zhang, Xibao (2009). Values, Expectations, Ad Hoc Rules, and Culture Emergence in International Cross Cultural Management Contexts. New York: Nova Science Publishers.
