= Three circles model =

The three circle model can be applied to different research approaches and models of organizational culture.

This model represents the interaction between the managerial culture, the workplace culture and the surrounding culture.

Managerial culture is the values of the management, and its norms, practices and artifacts. The workplace culture is the work and behavior norms as perceived by the workers point of view. The surrounding culture stands for the local norms and practices which characterize a national culture/ religious culture etc.

The three circles model - Raz 2002

The diagram presents a partial overlapping between the three circles. One must keep in mind, the relations among the circles are dynamic and their borders depend on the situation being studied. The model is not an area model and doesn't intend to describe certain numeric relations. Its objective is to describe the terms in a schematic manner.

The first circle describes the managerial culture, which is often perceived as the organizational culture.

The common part of circles 1 and 2, designates areas of congruity and acceptance, or "devotion" in management parlance. The second circle also provides room for "countercultures" and for workers' subversion of managerial culture.

The third circle represents the surrounding local culture, whose values, norms, and socialization can influence both acceptance and resistance to the managerial culture.

The three circles model is connected to some known theories in organizational sociology:

- The contingency theory claims that organizations develop in various institutional and cultural environments, and are influenced by them. Therefore, organizations will aspire to maximize the fit to their environment, as a mean to increase efficiency.
- The cultural contingency theory (Lincoln & Kallenberg, 1990), expects that over time, the norms and values of the organization will become compatible with the norms and values of the surrounding culture.

== See also ==
- Fail fast (business)
- Venn diagram
