= Fail fast (business) =

Business management concept

Fail fast, also sometimes termed fail often or fail cheap, is a business management concept and theory of organizational psychology that argues businesses should encourage employees to use a trial-and-error process to quickly determine and assess the long-term viability of a product or strategy and move on, cutting losses rather than continuing to invest in a doomed approach. It is an element of some organizations' corporate culture, particularly in the technology industry and in the United States' Silicon Valley.

A key rationale is that a failure is discovered before significant investment, at the earliest opportunities in an effort. The associated practices are designed to identify concerns before launching extensive research and development, and long before a release or rollout. Sometimes misunderstood as encouraging unmitigated failure, an essential tenet is "Principle 4: Contain the downside risk—fail cheaply."

The implied promise to employees is that the consequences of failure, if recognized quickly, would not negatively affect a person's position, job or career; a key component of a successful approach requires a corporate culture that not only tolerates but actively encourages and even celebrates failure that results in valuable learning for the organization. It has been criticized for lack of adherence to that implicit promise, for its risk of creating a culture of mediocrity, and for being overoptimistic about the learning benefits of failure.

== Concept ==
The concept and theory that argues businesses should adopt an aggressive and agile trial-and-error process to quickly determine and assess the long-term viability of a product or strategy, recognize that something is not going well, and make adjustments or move on to something else rather than investing years in a doomed approach.

The approach assumes an incremental project development process, with iterative checks to ensure the product or strategy will meet client, consumer or organizational needs before dedicating ongoing investment.

The concept was addressed in academia as early as 1992 by Sim Sitkin of Duke University.

=== Rationale ===
A key rationale is that a failure is discovered before release or rollout; this is to prevent larger losses incurred from a failed final product and the loss of reputation and trust that might incur.

Further rationales include that a corporation encouraging such an approach will cut their losses by not continuing to invest time and money in a doomed concept, rather than continuing to because the people in charge of the project are afraid of the consequences of admitting an expensive failure, a tendency known as the sunk cost effect. In addition, a corporation using such an approach would benefit more quickly from the learnings from past failures, enhancing the likelihood of quicker success on future projects.

=== Implied promise to employees ===
The implied promise to employees is that the corporate culture is one where failure is not just tolerated but actively encouraged and that a person's position, job or career would not be threatened by a failed project as long as the failure is recognized quickly. According to Ben Lutkevich, writing for TechTarget, to successfully use the approach organizations must "reframe failure as a positive. Failure should be seen as a necessary input for change and innovation". Columbia University professor of business Rita McGrath, writing in 2011 in the Harvard Business Review, recommended building "a culture that celebrates intelligent failure".

== Use ==
The concept has been widely employed as a metaphor in business, dating back to at least 2001. It is widely used in the technology and pharmaceutical industries. It became a mantra and badge of honor within startup culture and particularly within the technology industry and in the United States' Silicon Valley, where it is a common part of corporate culture.

=== Examples ===
Carol Bartz discussed a concept she termed "fail-fast forward" in a 2001 speech at Stanford University, describing a system she had implemented at Autodesk to "engineer a company to fail in certain missions, to be resilient to failure, and to respond to it by overcoming quickly".

Amazon's Jeff Bezos wrote in a 2015 letter to shareholders that "failure and invention are inseparable twins. To invent you have to experiment, and if you know in advance that it's going to work, it's not an experiment." Chaos Monkey is a Netflix project which intentionally simulates or induces failure to test the ability to recover. An early motto of Facebook was "Move fast and break things". Japanese chemicals firm Kao, while considering a proposed entry into the manufacture of floppy disks, tested the question of whether consumers would accept disks branded to a company not known for technology products by purchasing floppy disks from another manufacturer and branding them as Kao disks, thereby inexpensively assessing the likelihood of failure. Procter and Gamble's A. G. Lafley, in his book The Game-Changer, includes a list, which McGrath characterizes as "even [a celebration]", of expensive product failures and company learnings from those failures during his tenure as CEO.

Non-business examples of the psychological concept exist and are explored in Fail Fast, Fail Often, a self-help book by Stanford University's John Krumholtz and Ryan Babineaux.

== Criticism ==
In addressing the concept's implied promise to employees, Michael DePrisco of the Project Management Institute in 2022 criticized the concept as a bromide, writing that while managers encouraged employees to be willing to fail, in practice the consequences of failure often were damaging to jobs or careers. He argued that a slightly altered approach, which he calls "Learn fast", can work if management follows through on the implied offered job and career security for failing but also learning from those failures.

The concept has also been criticized, including by TechTarget and the University of Queensland business school, for its risk of encouraging mediocrity.

According to New Yorker, multiple studies of entrepreneurial success have shown that "the evidence suggests that past failure really just predicts future failure" and that the predicted learning benefits of failure might be over-optimistic.

== See also ==
- Agile software development – Umbrella term for certain approaches to software development
- Assessment culture
- Chaos engineering – In software engineering, experimenting with the product to test extreme situations
- FailCon, a conference for startup founders to learn from and prepare for failure
- Fail-fast system – System which reports likely failures, a similarly-named related concept in software engineering
- Museum of Failure – International exhibition of failed products and services
- Organizational behavior – Study of human behavior in organizational settings
- Organizational learning – Academic discipline; examines how goal-driven social entities add and create knowledge
- Organizational psychology – Branch of psychology
- Organizational studies – Academic field
- Silicon Valley culture – Technology hub in California, United States
- Three circles model
