= Jesse Robbins =

American entrepreneur

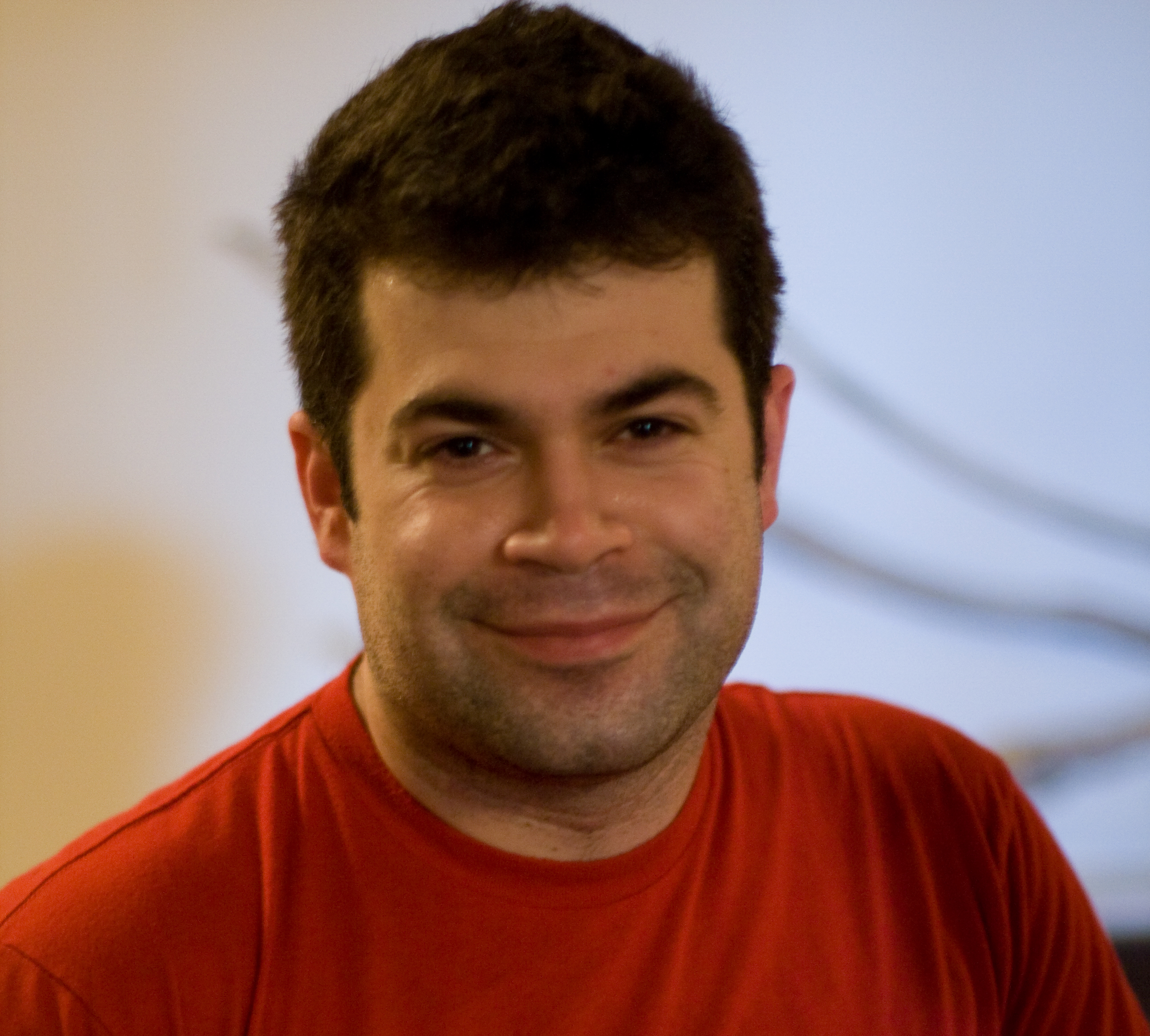
- Born: 1978 (age 47–48); Manchester-by-the-Sea, Massachusetts
- Occupations: Entrepreneur; investor; computer engineer; firefighter
- Employer(s): Heavybit, Chef, Amazon.com
- Known for: Pioneer in Cloud Computing, DevOps & Chaos Engineering; Founder of Chef & Orion Labs

Jesse Robbins is an American technology entrepreneur, investor, and firefighter notable for his pioneering work in Cloud computing, role in creating DevOps/Chaos Engineering, and efforts to improve emergency management.

== Career ==
Robbins is a venture capital investor at "developer-focused" firm Heavybit, with notable investments in companies like PagerDuty, Snyk, and Tailscale.

Robbins worked at Amazon with his manager-approved title “Master of Disaster,” where he was responsible for website availability for every property bearing the Amazon brand. He created "GameDay", a project to increase reliability by purposefully creating major failures on a regular basis (a practice now called Chaos Engineering).

Robbins has said GameDay was inspired by his experience & training as a firefighter combined with lessons from other industries and research on complex systems, human cognitive stress models, reliability engineering, and normal accidents. Game day/Chaos Engineering and similar approaches are considered a best practice for large technology companies.

GameDay-like programs have been adopted by many other organizations, including Google, Netflix (called Chaos Monkey), Yahoo, Facebook, and many others.

After Amazon, Robbins founded the Velocity Conference to advance the field of Web Operations & DevOps with Tim O'Reilly. He also founded Chef, a pioneering cloud infrastructure automation company. Jesse Robbins was also an early investor in PagerDuty.

Robbins was recognized in 2011 with the Technology Review TR35 award for "transforming the way Web companies design and manage complex networks of servers and software" at Amazon.com, founding the Velocity Web Performance & Operations Conference, and founding Chef and serving as the first CEO.

== Other work ==
Robbins founded Orion Labs, a technology startup which created a "Real-Life Star Trek Communicator". He says he "wanted to bring heads-up, real-time communication to everybody" to build "a world powered by voice".

== Contributions to disaster response & humanitarian aid ==
Robbins volunteered as “Task Force Leader” in Hurricane Katrina. After he returned, he worked with Mikel Maron and OpenStreetMap on techniques and patterns to improve technology adoption in disaster response & humanitarian aid. These improvements were adopted by the United Nations Joint Logistics Centre in response to Cyclone Nargis in 2008 and are now widely adopted. One example was CrisisCommons in response to the 2010 Haiti earthquake.

== Awards and recognition ==
2021 - Robbins named to The Seed 100: the Best Early-Stage Investors of 2021

2012 - Robbins was named as a Top 10 Cloud Computing Leader of 2012 by TechTarget

2011 - Robbins was selected by MIT Technology Review magazine as one of the top "35 under 35" TR35 innovators in for "transforming the way Web companies design and manage complex networks of servers and software" while building fault-tolerant online infrastructure at Amazon.com and at Chef.

2010 - Robbins was selected by Business Journal as one of the top "40 under 40" entrepreneurs in 2010 for founding Chef and raising $13 million in venture capital funding.
