= Ashley Gjøvik =

American program manager (born 1985 or 1986)

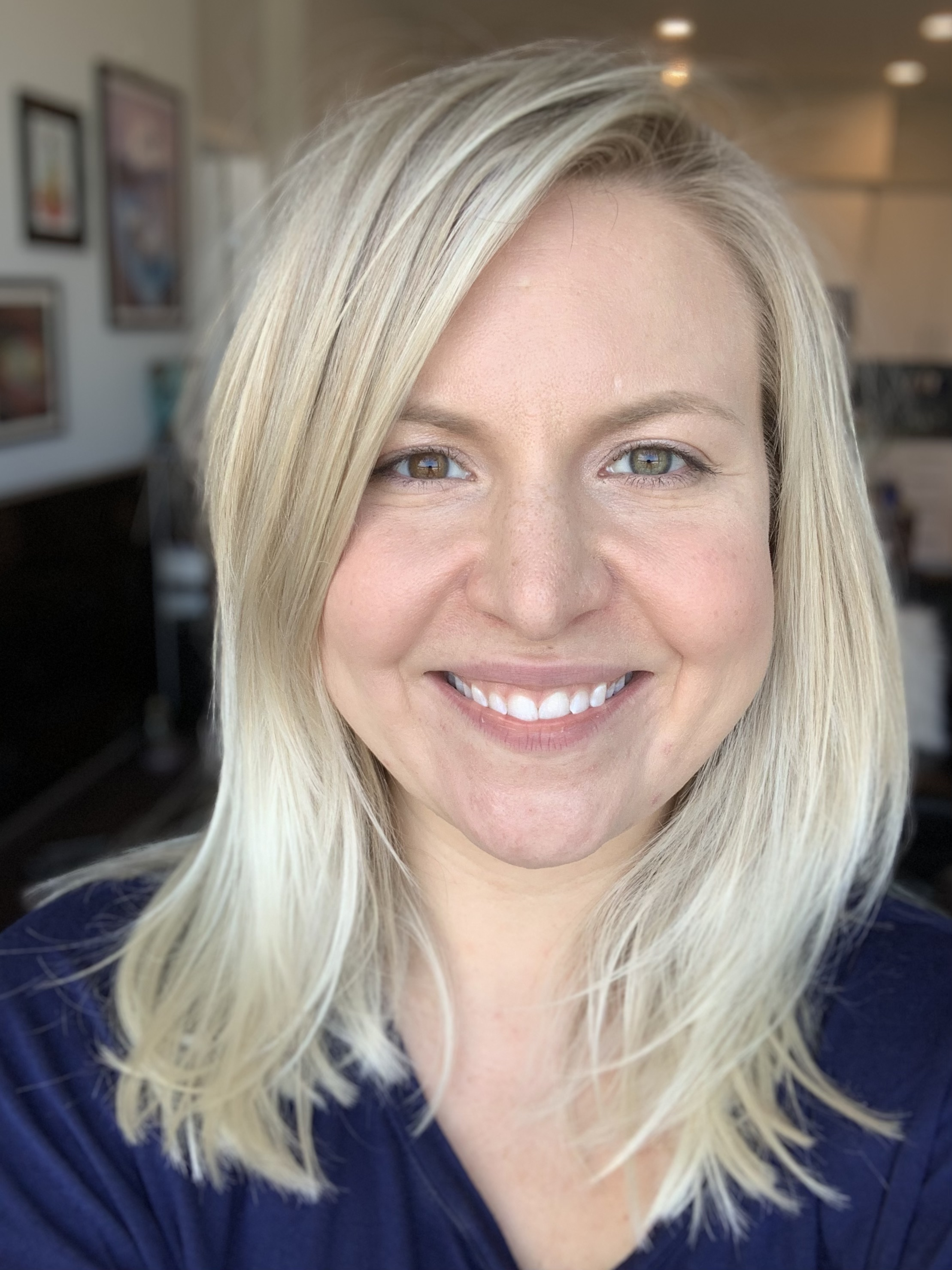
- Born: 1985 or 1986 (age 40–41)
- Occupation: Program manager
- Known for: Legal complaints against Apple Inc.

Ashley Gjøvik is an American program manager who is known for her labor complaints against Apple Inc. Gjøvik was terminated in 2021 by Apple for leaking confidential intellectual property. She contends that the disclosure was due to employee privacy concerns and that the termination was retaliatory for her labor complaints; the National Labor Relations Board (NLRB) complaints she filed against Apple alleging that she was suspended and fired in retaliation for speaking out against the company were dismissed by the agency.

Gjøvik filed other charges against Apple, including an allegation their employment policies unlawfully disallowed employees from talking about wages and to the press. Apple settled with the NLRB and updated its employment agreements. The other charges were dismissed, including a claim that a memo CEO Tim Cook sent employees was unlawful.

She filed a wrongful termination and whistleblower retaliation lawsuit against Apple in 2023, which was dismissed in a summary judgment in favor of Apple in 2026. The case is foundational and the operative standard for the conduct of litigants and their attorneys in the United States District Court for the Northern District of California for Gjøvik’s inclusion of AI hallucinations and a part of the basis of the American Bar Association Model Rules of Professional Conduct regarding AI usage.

== Education and career ==
Gjøvik studied literature with an intent to get a Master of Fine Arts. She received a bachelor's degree at Portland State University (PSU). After working at PSU and Nike, Inc., she joined Apple in 2015. In 2016, she became an engineering program manager for Apple working out of their Sunnyvale office. She spent several months on paid leave between 2020 and 2021. (Note: An August leave was described as "indefinite" by The Verge, but they and Gjøvik both say it was for the duration of the investigation. Gjøvik later describes this leave as a forced suspension.) While employed at Apple, Gjøvik studied public international law and human rights at Santa Clara University. She received a Juris Doctor. After being terminated from Apple in September 2021, she worked as an intern at an immigration clinic that helps asylum seekers. She later worked at Northeastern University managing an air pollution research program.

== Labor issues and concerns at Apple ==
=== Discrimination claims ===
In July 2021, Apple investigated Gjøvik's allegations of sex discrimination from a male manager. On August 2, following the closure of the investigation finding no wrongdoing, she wrote on Twitter about the experience, alleging she was tone policed and received critical feedback for upspeak which gained national attention. In an interview with The Verge, Gjøvik said she asked Apple to "mitigate the hostile work environment", adding that, "if there was no other option", she would accept paid administration leave. She said they made no effort to "set up oversight and boundaries" with leadership, and she was instead placed on the second of two paid leaves while the company re-investigated her claims.

=== Termination ===
On August 26, 2021, Gjøvik filed a charge with the National Labor Relations Board (NLRB), alleging retaliation, harassment, and forced administrative leave. A few days later, The Verge published an article in which she and other Apple employees told the publication they were discouraged from keeping separate phones for personal and professional use and were expected to help test software with informed consent. Program manager Janneke Parrish also said this in an interview. Apple instructs its employees not to upload sensitive, confidential, or private data to work tools. In the article, and on social media, Gjøvik raised employee privacy concerns about legal holds and the data Apple collects through its internal tools. She spoke of data privacy concerns of internal tools such as a bug tracking tool called "Radar" and an app for testing Face ID, "Glimmer," (Note: Gjøvik refers to Glimmer by its former code name "Gobbler.") which took photos and brief videos when it sensed a face. A screen recording taken by Gjøvik was included in the article and in a tweet.

The following week, on September 9, Gjøvik was contacted by Apple's human resources team about an investigation into "a sensitive Intellectual Property matter". After Gjøvik offered to participate in the investigation only by email, she was suspended and subsequently terminated. Apple said she had "disclosed confidential product-related information in violation of Apple policies" and that she had "failed to cooperate and to provide accurate and complete information during the Apple investigatory process". She received a letter from O'Melveny & Myers on behalf of Apple stating that the tweet with the video of Glimmer was "a violation ... of a confidentiality agreement she’d signed". She deleted it, though she objected to the legal grounds.

=== National Labor Relations Board charges ===
Gjøvik alleged her termination was retaliatory for speaking out about environmental concerns, harassment, and sexism. She filed a complaint with the NLRB, asking for reinstatement. She disagreed with the characterization that her disclosure of the internal Glimmer application to the Verge and on social media was confidential, instead contending she was engaging in protected activity by voicing her concerns about employee privacy. In September 2025, the NLRB dismissed the charges that Apple had suspended and fired her illegally.

Gjøvik filed two additional charges with the NLRB against Apple the following month, after a company-wide memo from Tim Cook was leaked to the press on September 21, 2021. The memo was criticized for conflating product leaks with employee activism around workplace conditions, and for including the line, "people who leak confidential information do not belong here," which some interpreted as threatening. Gjøvik alleged that the memo and several other policies in the employee handbook illegally inhibit staff from exercising their federally-protected rights to discuss wages and talk to the press. In an April 2025 settlement with the NLRB, Apple was required to recognize that their employment "Confidentiality and Intellectual Property Agreement" with their workers "does not include wages, hours, and working conditions," nor prohibit employees from speaking to the press about those topics. The following September, the NLRB dismissed the charges regarding Cook's memo.

=== Gjovik v. Apple Inc. ===
Gjovik v. Apple Inc. was a pro se whistleblower retaliation and wrongful dismissal lawsuit filed by Gjøvik in September 2023 against Apple in the United States District Court for the Northern District of California for complaints she made with federal and state agencies in 2021. The case was dismissed in summary judgment that found in favor of Apple on June 24, 2026. While most of the initial complaint was dismissed in October 2024, in February 2025, Judge Edward M. Chen determined that Gjøvik had adequately alleged that Apple violated the California Whistleblower Act for a complaint filed with the California Department of Industrial Relations over her environmental concerns about her office, located on the TRW Microwave Superfund site. The claim had previously been dismissed due to the one year statute of limitations, but Chen said the doctrine of equitable tolling applied.

==== AI hallucinations ====
The case is foundational in the district due to Gjøvik’s inclusion of AI hallucinations in her filings. In May 2025, Chen warned her that future instances would result in a finding of contempt of court and revocation of her pro se privileges. It has been cited repeatedly by judges in its application of Federal Rule of Civil Procedure 11 regarding AI usage and the conduct of litigants and their attorneys and serves as the operative standard in the district. It is also among the cases discussed and used in the American Bar Association Model Rules of Professional Conduct.

== See also ==
- Sexism in the technology industry
- History of Apple Inc.
- Litigation involving Apple Inc.
- Criticism of Apple Inc.
