= Chaos Monkeys =

2016 book

Chaos Monkeys: Obscene Fortune and Random Failure in Silicon Valley
- Paperback edition
- Author: Antonio Garcia Martinez
- Language: English
- Genre: Biographies, business, engineering
- Publisher: HarperCollins
- Publication date: June 28, 2016
- Publication place: United States
- Media type: Print
- Pages: 528 pp.
- ISBN: 978-0-06-245819-3 (Hardcover)

Chaos Monkeys: Obscene Fortune and Random Failure in Silicon Valley is an autobiography written by American tech entrepreneur Antonio García Martínez. The book likens Silicon Valley to the "Chaos Monkeys" of society. In the book, the author details his career experiences with launching a tech startup, selling it to Twitter, and working at Facebook from its pre-IPO stage.

== Summary ==
Chaos Monkeys recounts Antonio Garcia Martinez's career path. It starts as Martinez explains his quant work at Goldman, to an existing startup, to his own startup, and ultimately to larger Silicon Valley companies. He writes about real situations and discloses the inside stories he believes fill every industry. Garcia attempts to explain how advertising technology, startups, and venture capital work.

== Reception ==
Bloomberg Businessweek reported, "Unlike most founding narratives that flow out of the Valley, Chaos Monkeys dives into the unburnished, day-to-day realities: the frantic pivots, the enthusiastic ass-kissing, the excruciating internal politics.... [Garcia] can be rude, but he's shrewd, too." In CNN's review, the headline says the book "compares Facebook's culture to fascism but fails to prove it". TechCrunch wrote, "If you're in a startup or even plan to sue one, Chaos Monkeys is the book to read."

On May 10, 2021, Business Insider reported that the author had been hired by Apple. Opposition quickly mounted within the firm, and the book became notorious for what some claimed was misogynistic content, including the following and many similar passages:

She [British Trader] had wild green eyes, with unnatural red spots in her irises when you pulled close, reminiscent of that Afghan girl from the National Geographic cover. Her personality was flinty and rough, and as leathery as her skin. She had spent years between various jobs backpacking around the rougher parts of the world. She was an imposing, broad-shouldered presence, six feet tall in bare feet, and towering over me in heels.

Most women in the Bay Area are soft and weak, cosseted and naive despite their claims of worldliness, and generally full of shit. They have their self-regarding entitlement feminism, and ceaselessly vaunt their independence, but the reality is, come the epidemic plague or foreign invasion, they’d become precisely the sort of useless baggage you’d trade for a box of shotgun shells or a jerry can of diesel.

British Trader, on the other hand, was the sort of woman who would end up a useful ally in that postapocalypse, doing whatever work—be it carpentry, animal husbandry, or a shotgun blast to someone's back—required doing. Long story short, you wanted to tie your genetic wagon to the bucking horse of her bloodline.

The Verge quoted those passages in this fuller context where García Martínez was contrasting "women in the Bay Area" to the impressively capable woman he was involved with, who had the opposite characteristics.

Over 2,000 employees signing a letter demanding an investigation into the failures of the background check process that allowed him to be hired. On May 12, Apple announced that Martínez had been fired.
