= Robin J. Ely =

American economist

Robin J. Ely is an American economist currently the Diane Doerge Wilson Professor of Business Administration at Harvard Business School. Her interest are gender and race relations. Her most cited academic paper in the field, "Making differences matter" (with DA Thomas) in the Harvard Business Review, has been cited 1770 times, according to Google Scholar, and her analysis has been published in The Washington Post.

== Education ==
She earned her B.A. from Smith College and her Ph.D. in organizational behavior from Yale University.

== Publications ==
- DA Thomas, RJ Ely, Making differences matter, Harvard Business Review, 1996 Sep;74(5):79-90.
- RJ Ely, DA Thomas, Cultural diversity at work: The effects of diversity perspectives on work group processes and outcomes,'Administrative Science Quarterly, 2001 Jun;46(2):229-73.
- Thomas Kochan, Katerina Bezrukova, Robin Ely, Susan Jackson, Aparna Joshi, Karen Jehn, Jonathan Leonard, David Levine, David Thomas, "The effects of diversity on business performance: Report of the diversity research network," . Human Resource Management, 2003 Mar 1;42(1):3-21.
- RJ Ely, "The power in demography: Women's social constructions of gender identity at work," Academy of Management Journal 38, no. 3 (1995): 589–634.
