= Antonio García Martínez (author) =

American entrepreneur and author

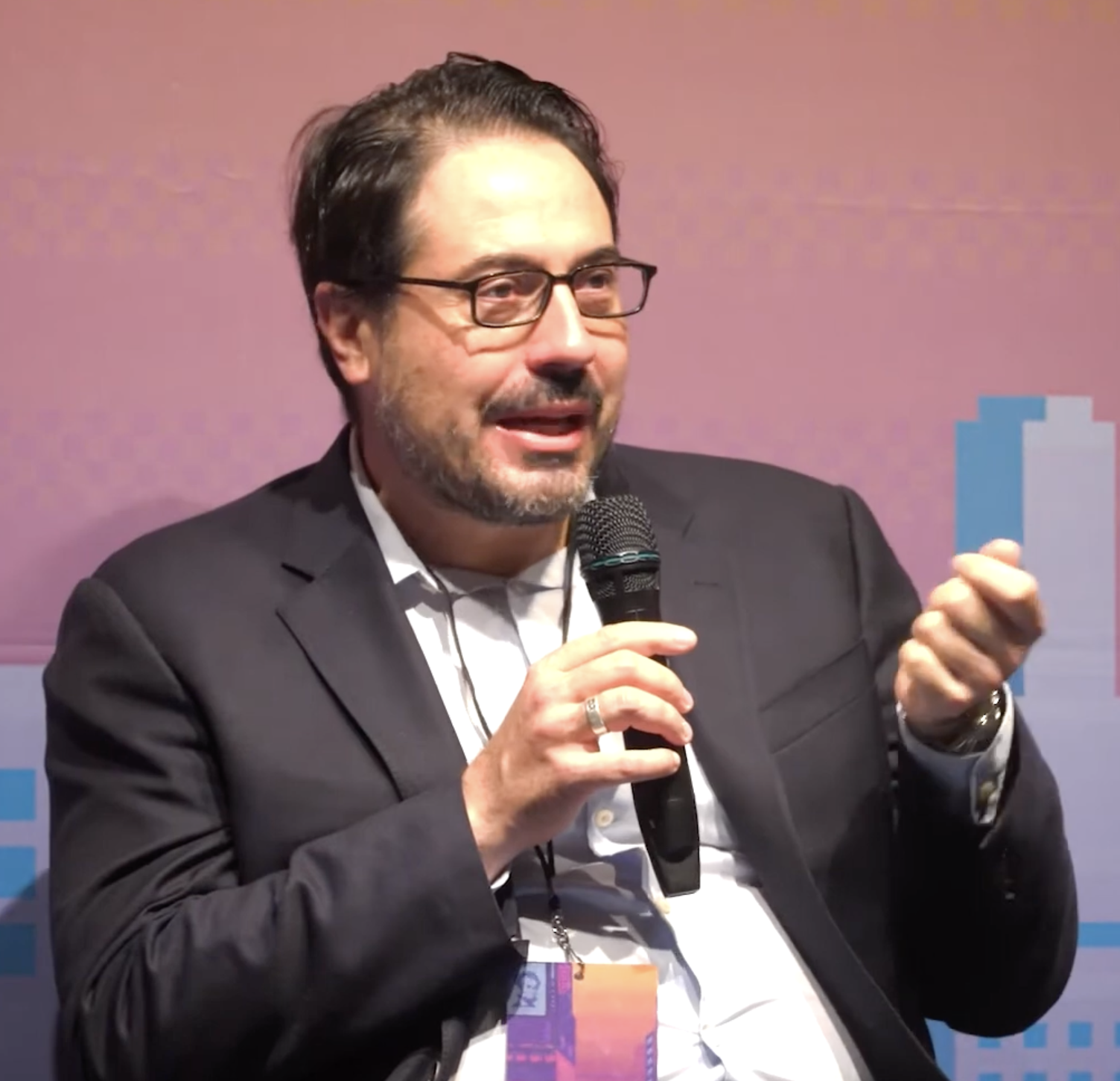
- Antonio García Martínez in 2022

Antonio García Martínez, also known by his initials AGM, is a New York Times best-selling author and tech entrepreneur. He is the Director of Ads at Base, as well as a former product manager for Facebook, the CEO-founder of AdGrok, and a former quantitative analyst for Goldman Sachs.

He has contributed articles to Wired, Vanity Fair, Business Insider, The Guardian, HuffPost, and The Washington Post.

== Career ==
After studying physics in the University of California, Berkeley, García Martínez worked as a pricing quant at Goldman Sachs beginning in September 2005. Due to the 2008 financial crisis, García Martínez left Goldman Sachs in March 2008 and joined Adchemy as a research scientist in April of that year. After leaving Adchemy in May 2010, he co-founded and was CEO of AdGrok, an adtech company that helped businesses automate Google AdWords selection and bidding. AdGrok was accepted to Y Combinator and was later sold to Twitter for $10 million in May 2011. While AdGrok's co-founders Matthew McEachen and Argyris Zymnis joined Twitter, García Martínez accepted a role as Facebook's first product manager of ad targeting in April 2011, leading product management for the Facebook Exchange (FBX), Facebook's now-defunct ad exchange for real-time bidding. An influential figure on the social network's early ad product team, he left Facebook in April 2013.

After leaving Facebook, García Martínez held roles at adtech company Nanigans and mobile measurement firm Branch. He also served as an advisor to Twitter.

In 2016, García Martínez released a book entitled Chaos Monkeys: Obscene Fortune and Random Failure in Silicon Valley published by HarperCollins, which is an autobiography that details his career experiences with launching AdGrok, selling it to Twitter, and working at Facebook from its pre-IPO stage. Chaos Monkeys was generally well received by the tech press after its debut.

He is a contributor to Wired.

On May 10, 2021, Business Insider reported that García Martínez had been working on Apple's Advertising Platforms team since April of that year, a sign that Apple was potentially looking to grow its ads division after killing off its iAd ad network in 2016.

News of García Martínez's hiring was criticized by Zac Hall at 9to5Mac's due to his depictions of women in Chaos Monkeys, and Apple employees circulated a petition criticizing prose in the book about women in the San Francisco Bay Area, such as calling them "soft and weak" and "cosseted and naive," which they interpreted as misogynistic. On May 12, Apple confirmed to Axios that García Martínez was no longer employed at the company, stating that it had "always strived to create an inclusive, welcoming workplace." García Martínez stated that the passage cited in the petition had been quoted out of context and said in a statement that Apple executives were aware of his book, and that his personal references were questioned about his character. Vox reported that "some in the tech industry argued that García Martínez was being unfairly punished for his personal writing."

In 2023, García Martínez founded Web3 startup Spindl. He was also involved with the University of Austin, a school cofounded by venture capitalist Joe Lonsdale, journalist Bari Weiss, and others.

In February 2025, Antonio joined Base, an Ethereum layer‑2 platform developed by Coinbase, as Director of Ads.

== Books ==
- García Martínez, Antonio. Chaos Monkeys: Obscene Fortune and Random Failure in Silicon Valley. HarperCollins. ISBN 9781473550322.

== Personal ==
In 2021, García Martínez announced that he had converted to Judaism from Catholicism.
