= Gender equality in the technology industry =

Sexism in the technology industry manifests in various forms—overt, subtle, and covert occupational sexism—creating a hostile and exclusionary environment for women. This not only diminishes the accessibility and profitability of the sector but also perpetuates a lack of diversity in the technology industry. Despite regional variations, women's representation in the tech field hovers between 4% and 20%, influenced by entrenched gender stereotypes, biased investment decisions, male-dominated work cultures, and a pervasive lack of awareness surrounding sexual harassment. Historical data paints a stark picture: while women earned 37.1% of U.S. computer science degrees in 1984, this figure plummeted to 17.6% by 2011 and has remained stagnant since. Silicon Valley, often lauded as the cradle of technological innovation, has been criticized for failing to address these disparities. Margaret O'Mara, a historian, notes that Silicon Valley's male-dominated oligopoly replicates traditional power structures, marginalizing women, people of color, and other minorities, ultimately reinforcing a homogenous tech culture. Moreover, systemic issues such as unequal pay, limited venture capital access, and pervasive workplace harassment contribute to the exodus of women from the industry. In response, various initiatives, like diversity-focused conferences and nonprofits, are striving to create more inclusive environments, yet the road to equity remains fraught with challenges, as demonstrated by the continued underrepresentation of women at executive levels and in technical roles across leading firms like Google and other tech giants.

== Statistics ==
In 1970, 13.6% of U.S. computer science and information science bachelor's degrees were awarded to women. By 1984, that number rose to 37.1%. In 2011, however, this percentage hit its nadir after two and a half decades of consistent decline, with only 17.6% of undergraduate computer science degrees going to women. From 2007 to 2015, this number remained relatively similar, ranging from 17.6 to 18.2%. In 2018 and 2019, the last years with comprehensive data available from the US government, 19% and 20% of U.S. computer and information science degrees were awarded to women respectively.

In May 2014, Google posted on its official blog that only 30 percent of its employees globally were women, acknowledging the diversity gap within its workforce.

In January 2015, The New York Times reported that "the largest technology companies have released reports showing that only 30% of their employees are women", with the percentage of technical employees being even lower.

A Fortune magazine review of data available for the 92 US-based venture capital firms which had raised "at least one fund of $200 million or more" between 2009 and 2014 found "only 17 had even one senior female partner", and only 4.2% of "partner level VCs" were female, highlighting gender inequity in leadership roles.

An Open Diversity Data website has been created to provide transparent access to diversity data for specific companies, aiming to promote accountability.

Only 11% of Silicon Valley executives and about 20% of software developers are women. At Google, only 18% of technical employees are women, a statistic the company has been struggling to improve. On Forbes' 2015 Top Tech Investors list, of 100 investors, five were women. Women in technology earn significantly less than men, with men earning up to 61% more than their female colleagues in equivalent positions. "Bias against women in tech is pervasive", according to an October 2014 op-ed in The New York Times, underlining the systemic barriers women face.

A 2015 survey entitled "The Elephant in the Valley" conducted a comprehensive survey of two hundred senior-level women in Silicon Valley. 84% of participants reported being told they were "too aggressive" in the office, and 66% stated that they were excluded from important events purely due to their gender. In addition, 60% of women revealed that they received unwanted sexual advances in their respective workplaces – the majority of which came from a superior. Almost 40% did not report the incidents out of fear of retaliation or potential career consequences.

The New York Times obtained a copy of Google's Salary Spreadsheet in 2014, which depicts each employee's salary and bonus information. This spreadsheet reported that at Google, women receive lower salaries than their male counterparts for five out of the six job titles listed.

A United Nations report predicts that females will likely bear the brunt of future layoffs in technological fields.

== Media reports ==
In 1997, Anita Borg, then a senior researcher at Digital Equipment Corporation (DEC) openly complained that women "run into subtle sexism every day" in their professional environments. At the time only one woman, Carol Bartz of Autodesk, was a chief executive officer (CEO) among the largest Silicon Valley technology companies. Furthermore, only 5.6% of the area's 1,686 major tech firms were run by women. It was even harder for female entrepreneurs trying to break into the industry. Of the $33.5 billion in venture capital invested in tech from 1991 through the second quarter of 1996, only a dismal 1.6% went to companies launched or headed by women, leaving many innovative ideas underfunded.

The 2015 Crunchies award event, organized by Silicon Valley tech industry blogs, was heavily criticized for its inappropriate use of derogatory language towards women.

Multiple gender harassment and discrimination lawsuits in Silicon Valley have since received widespread media attention. One of the most widely reported was Pao v. Kleiner Perkins, a high-profile discrimination lawsuit against Kleiner Perkins by then Reddit interim CEO Ellen Pao, which went to trial in 2015. Pao's lawsuit, which alleged that Perkins indulged in discriminatory double standards and denied her the senior partner position, resulted in a controversial verdict for the defendant. Three jurors cited Pao's "increasingly negative performance reviews" as the primary reason for their decision, although others believed gender bias was involved.

On September 20, 2016, Tesla employee AJ Vandermayden filed a significant lawsuit against her company alleging sex discrimination, retaliation, and multiple other workplace violations. Vandermayden brought this lawsuit after learning her salary was substantially lower than those of the eight other employees, all male, with whom she worked most closely, despite the fact that some of them had just finished college. She was also subjected to a much harsher standard in order to receive a promotion and pay raise that many of her male colleagues had received simply for working at the company for a certain period of time, regardless of their performance.

In Silicon Valley, start-up surveillance company Verkada Inc. was accused of sexism and discrimination against female employees after a sales director used the company's facial recognition system to harass female workers by taking unauthorized photos of them.

== Possible causes ==
=== Investment of grants and conscious belief in intellectual sex differences ===
Some scholars studying discrimination in the tech industry argue that since decision-makers in the tech industry often believe that men are inherently more technically competent than women, they think that it is economically a better investment to employ male tech personnel and to allocate higher budgets to the male staff than to the female staff. According to this model, those investments lead to more opportunities for male staff to produce high quality results, which in turn reinforces the statistical bias and is used as an argument for male technical superiority, causing a damaging self-fulfilling prophecy. These scholars argue that the main problem is not merely unconscious bias, but a conscious belief in allegedly scientific notions of sex differences, citing that the percentage of women in the highest quality tech work have decreased despite a decline in traditional and unconscious gender bias. At the same time, quotas of women at lower levels of tech have slightly improved, though supposedly scientific claims of sex differences have increased and can account for the heightened discrimination at top tech positions. While this model states that there is systematic discrimination towards women in tech, it explains it as a result of specific economical investment issues and does not presume a society-wide patriarchal structure nor even that discrimination must necessarily favor men in all other aspects of society.

=== Gender stereotypes ===
Men are traditionally seen as typically more authoritative, commanding, and influential than women. In tasks that are perceived as masculine by society, women are often given less influence and are not considered reliable experts, even if they possess equivalent or superior qualifications. Only when a task is stereotyped as feminine will a woman have more influence or authority than a man. Violating gender-stereotypic norms results in social penalties, often leading to isolation or being labeled difficult to work with.

Men are believed to be more self-assertive and motivated to master their environment [while] women are believed to be more selfless and concerned with others, reinforcing occupational gender divides.

=== Early childhood development ===
According to studies of early childhood development in human children, boys preferred technical toys (e.g. wheeled vehicles) while girls preferred social toys (e.g. furry animals). The same holds for non-human children, such as rhesus and vervet monkeys.

However, critics argue that since infants interact with other humans from birth, even if only with their parents, and rapidly absorb accents and cultural norms, the concept of a pre-socialized stage has been questioned; monkeys that have been studied in primatology are often those that have lived close to human settlements and thus imitated human habits, which may not reflect purely natural behavior, and are therefore not non-socialized either. Some researchers counter that there would be no evolutionary function for a brain mechanism that starts to distinguish social phenomena from other phenomena before socialization starts. Therefore, distinctions between toys that predate socialization might not accurately predict interests later in life.

Additionally, primatologists argue that in some groups, female chimpanzees hunt and use tools as effectively as males, suggesting that there is no innate universal primate bias towards technology being male-oriented.

=== Science, engineering and technology (SET) culture ===
The "Hidden Brain Drain", a comprehensive 2006 project, analyzed the careers of women in SET industries. It found that the following characteristic of the SET culture, sometimes called the "Athena Effect" may systematically exclude women workers from advancing their careers:

- Masculine communication style and masculine group activities that alienate women
- Unsustainable working hours, which conflict with caregiving responsibilities
- Intense pressure to have or care for children
- Lack of organizational support when taking calculated professional risks

Despite the deep satisfaction that many women find in science, technology, engineering, and math (STEM) careers, studies show that a primary reason young women do not pursue STEM from an early age is due to pervasive negative cultural messages inclining them toward other subjects. However, the technology industry itself is not solely responsible for the lack of women in STEM careers. According to Brown and Leaper, "Many parents tend to have higher expectations of sons over daughters in math, science, computers, and sports" which can further discourage girls from developing an interest in technology. Thus, childhood upbringing and societal expectations play a significant role in contributing to gender bias in the technology industry.

=== Male dominated environment ===
According to an essay in The Atlantic, women leave the tech industry at twice the rate men do due to the challenging work culture. In addition to this, according to various studies, there is already an imbalanced gender ratio in the technology industry to begin with. Women are estimated to make up only about 25% of employees in the industry, and only 11% of executives in the technology industry are women. Google has also released data indicating that only 17% of the company's employees are women. Since men dominate the industry, corporate events and industry conferences often cater to their preferences, occasionally in ways which some women perceive as hostile, such as by hiring sexually provocative female performers and product promoters. Instances of sexual harassment at such events are also widely reported, contributing to an environment that feels exclusionary. This along with more subtle hostility such as offensive male humor can turn women away from the industry, further exacerbating the demographic imbalance that already exists.

=== Lack of awareness about sexual harassment ===
The principle of sexual harassment has only recently been formally recognized by the United States federal government as a legal issue. The first reported case that led to the recognition of sexual harassment as a legal concept was in 1977, in which a woman was fired from her job for refusing her boss' sexual advances. Nine years later, in 1986, the United States Supreme Court recognized cases like these as sexual harassment and as a violation of the Civil Rights Act of 1964. However, the idea of sexual harassment was not truly recognized by the broader public until a landmark case against a Supreme Court nominee was brought forward to Congress in 1991. Overall, sexual harassment was not fully recognized by the United States until the late 1900s, leading to a lack of reported incidents up until that point, as well as an increasing, but still underdeveloped, public awareness of the issue, which persists to this day.

== Effects ==
As of 2004, only 4% of the engineering workforce in the UK were women. In information technology (IT), the Dice Salary Survey estimated that between 2008 and 2009, women earned an average of 12.43% less in salary than males. However, it is unclear if the Dice survey specifically addresses sexist discrimination as a possible cause for women to earn lower average salaries in technology, or if the pay gap between men and women can be accounted for by differences in training, seniority, competence, overtime, or other variables that can effect salary. In addition to unequal pay, one study suggests that women are often excluded from informal work networks and become targets of bullying such as sexual harassment.

== Incidents ==
In 2012, women created "creeper move" cards, in red, yellow, and green, to hand out at the DEF CON security conference as an indication of what they perceived to be inappropriate behavior from men. The conference in 2013 featured a game show called "Hacker Jeopardy" (a spoof of Jeopardy!), in which hostess Vinyl Vanna presided by removing an article of clothing with each correct answer.

In March 2013 at PyCon, attendee Adria Richards overheard a conversation by two men where they joked about a "dongle" as well as saying they'd "like to fork his [the speaker's] repo" (a non-sexual phrase meaning they'd like to build on the speaker's code). She photographed the men and Tweeted their photo to complain to the Pycon staff. This led to a controversy that came to be known as Donglegate, which included counterpoints that Richards herself had recently made jokes online about the penis size of a man. As a result, one of the men was fired along with Richards herself.

In September 2013, an application called Titstare made its debut at the TechCrunch Disrupt conference. Its subject, men staring at women's breasts, proved too much for several commentators. After he defended the app against allegations of misogyny on Twitter, Business Insider Chief technology officer Pax Dickinson was forced to resign. Dickinson later wrote an apology, which was published on VentureBeat. His cofounder and former business partner, Elissa Shevinsky, wrote an article titled That's It — I'm Finished Defending Sexism In Tech, and said "I had defended DefCon's right to do whatever they want. I had suggested on Twitter that Women 2.0 and the Hacker Dojo start an alternative security conference. I was wrong. I take this back. We shouldn't have to." Much of the criticism appeared on Twitter, with one representative tweet stating, "There goes my attempt to teach my 9 [year old] girl how welcoming tech industry is to women."

At the 2015 SXSW festival, White House Chief Technology Officer Megan Smith was interrupted multiple times by Google's Executive Chairman Eric Schmidt during a panel discussion on "Sexism in Technology". The head of Google's Unconscious Bias program pointed this out during the discussion and received applause from the audience.

On October 5, 2015, software developer Sage Sharp, known for contributing USB3 support to Linux and coordinating Outreachy, revealed that they had stopped writing kernel patches after feeling antagonized and seeing what they called "subtle sexist or homophobic jokes" on the mailing list. Although noting that the community's lack of resources was partially to blame, they referred to past discussions in which they sharply criticized the attitudes of Linus Torvalds and Ingo Molnár. The following day, Matthew Garrett stated that he would also leave kernel development and agreed with Sharp's assessment of Torvalds' communication style. One kernel developer, James Bottomley, urged them to reconsider and stated that the mailing list had made efforts to increase civility in the two years since the most vocal clashes involving Sharp.

One month after the posts by Sage Sharp, Eric S. Raymond addressed readers to claim that women's advocacy groups were looking for opportunities to accuse Linus Torvalds and other open source figures of sexual assault at technical conferences. The post contained logs of an IRC chat with an anonymized contact who claimed that the Ada Initiative had such goals. The source claimed that "They have made multiple runs at him.", and as a result he was no longer willing to risk mentoring women who are already in the technology industry. He then elaborated that Linus Torvalds no longer spends any time alone at conferences, to which Eric S. Raymond responded by stating that he would take his source's implied advice.

In 2015, Ellen Pao, an employee at Caufield & Byers, accused the firms of creating an environment riddled with sexism that greatly impacted her career. On a business trip for the firm, an incident occurred in which a male employee came to her hotel room and propositioned her. The firm neglected to recognize the behavior of this man as sexual harassment, even though other similar incidents about this individual had been reported.

=== Intersectionality ===
Gender-discrimination cases in the technology industry often concern not only gender, but race as well. Women of color are affected especially by gender-discrimination as they face two vectors of oppression: sexism and racism. It has been reported in a 2014 diversity report that women make up 17% of Google's employees. In that same report, it was found that Hispanics make up 2% of Google's workers and African-Americans make up only 1%. Because it is a field that is viewed as a meritocracy, tech companies are often hesitant to change the demographic of their employees.

=== Nadella controversy ===
While speaking at the Grace Hopper Celebration of Women in Computing on 9 October 2014, Microsoft CEO Satya Nadella responded to a request for what his advice would be for women who are uncomfortable asking for a raise. Nadella stated: "It's not really about asking for the raise, but knowing and having faith that the system will actually give you the right raises as you go along," Nadella said, according to a recording on the website of the event.

"Because that's good karma," Nadella continued. "It'll come back because somebody's going to know that's the kind of person that I want to trust."

After the comments produced a strong backlash in the media and in social media, Nadella issued an apology, "Was inarticulate re how women should ask for raise. Our industry must close gender pay gap so a raise is not needed because of a bias" he tweeted several hours after his remarks.

Microsoft also issued a memo on its website in which Nadella wrote: "I answered that question completely wrong," said the memo. "I believe men and women should get equal pay for equal work. And when it comes to career advice on getting a raise when you think it's deserved, Maria's advice was the right advice. If you think you deserve a raise, you should just ask."

=== C Plus Equality ===
In November 2013, a HASTAC user named Arielle Schlesinger, studying the relation between feminist theory and programming paradigms, made a post soliciting feedback on the creation of a feminist programming language.

Later that year, a group calling itself the Feminist Software Foundation released a language called C Plus Equality (C+=) with syntax similar to C++. Although announced as the type of feminist programming language that Schlesinger had in mind, the alleged purpose of the code was satirizing the social justice–oriented part of Internet culture and included numerous references to rape, boogeyman and trigger warnings.

C+= was originally posted to GitHub but was removed for violating GitHub's terms of use, moving later to Bitbucket. It was later moved to Bitbucket but after a debate with the legal team, it was removed on December 19, 2013.

=== "Google's Ideological Echo Chamber" memo ===
An internal memo on Google's ideological stance toward diversity, where it is argued that Google had shut down the conversation about diversity, and suggested that gender inequality in the technology industry was, in part, due to biological differences between men and women.

== Proposed solutions ==
Current gender roles and expectations may hold back women from entering, sustaining, and advancing in the technology field, often causing them to feel unwelcome or undervalued within predominantly male environments. To combat sexism in technology, researchers have suggested that companies take responsibility and change their organizational structure issues instead of expecting women to adapt to the current state of the work environment, which often perpetuates gender disparities. One proposed change would be to have more than simple diversity programs; companies need to ensure that their work environments are genuinely inclusive, creating spaces where individuals with diverse backgrounds and thought processes can collaborate effectively to achieve shared organizational objectives.

According to Schiebinger, women should not assimilate to the profession, but should instead modify it to better suit a broader range of perspectives; increased representation of minorities in IT means little to nothing if there remains an unaccommodating, exclusionary industry culture. Ray McCarthy, a Middle School technology education teacher, believes that educational institutions also have a crucial role to play in addressing sexism within the technology industry. He suggests that classrooms should have an inviting and inclusive atmosphere that engages with all students, validates their interests, and supports positive inquiry, encouraging girls to explore tech fields early on.

Several conferences, such as the Grace Hopper Celebration of Women in Computing, have afforded women in technology the ability to pursue their career interests in a supportive environment separate from the predominantly male-dominated spaces. These events not only represent a part of the technology industry specifically created by and for women, but also offer a unique platform from which women can influence broader industry practices and policies.

Another proposed solution is presented by Project include, a nonprofit organization established with the mission of giving everyone a fair chance to succeed in the technology industry. By using the three key values of inclusion, comprehensiveness, and accountability, the organization works to develop actionable solutions to diversity and inclusion challenges that persist across the tech sector. They emphasize:

- Inclusion: Companies should actively improve opportunities for underrepresented groups, ensuring fair hiring and promotion practices.
- Comprehensiveness: Solutions must address all facets of the company, including its culture, operations, and team dynamics, to foster a genuinely inclusive environment.
- Accountability: Companies must consistently track the outcomes of their initiatives to measure progress, allowing them to hold themselves accountable for the effectiveness of their diversity efforts.

By implementing these strategies, the technology industry could shift toward a more equitable and supportive environment for all.

== Criticism ==
Forbes columnist Joseph Steinberg wrote of witnessing multiple sexist situations, including a technology company founder referred to as a "Booth Babe" at a trade show. He blamed disproportionate technology-industry sexism, and a low number of females in the field, on a large number of computing-related startup companies hiring primarily young workers, thereby creating "an environment in which many firms' technical teams consist largely of workers who are just out of college, sometimes giving the businesses fraternity-like cultures, leading to sexism that discourages female participation." Douglas Macmillan of Bloomberg Businessweek has referred to this phenomenon as "brogrammer culture".

A cover story appearing on the January 15, 2015 issue of Newsweek magazine, titled What Silicon Valley Thinks of Women proved controversial, both due to its illustration, described as "the cartoon of a faceless female in spiky red heels, having her dress lifted up by a cursor arrow", and its content, described as "a 5,000-word article on the creepy, sexist culture of the tech industry". Among those offended by the cover were Today Show co-host Tamron Hall, who commented "I think it's obscene and just despicable, honestly." Newsweek editor in chief James Impoco explained "We came up with an image that we felt represented what that story said about Silicon Valley ... If people get angry, they should be angry." The article's author, Nina Burleigh commented, "Where were all these offended people when women like Heidi Roizen published accounts of having a venture capitalist stick her hand in his pants under a table while a deal was being discussed?"

== See also ==
- Ada Initiative
- Anita Borg Institute for Women and Technology
- Gender bias on Wikipedia
- Hjernevask
- Feminism
- Gamergate controversy
- Gender pay gap in the United States tech industry
- Sexism
- Sexism in academia
- Sexism in video gaming
- Sexism in venture capital
- Sexual harassment
- Women in computing
- Women in venture capital
