= Criticism of Amazon =

Varied criticism across business areas

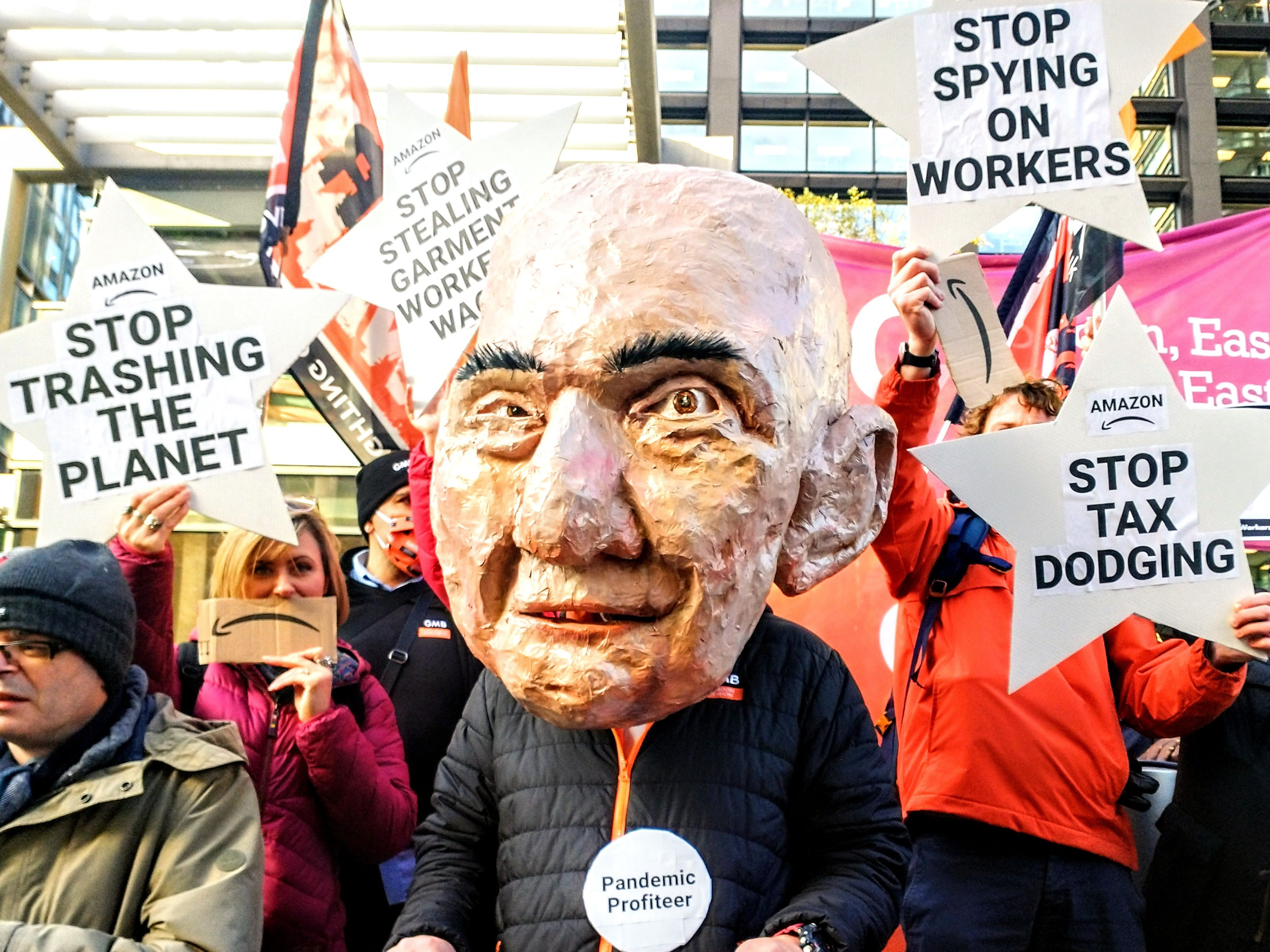
Placards and a papier-mâché Jeff Bezos head at London "Make Amazon Pay" protest in 2021

Amazon has been criticized on many issues, including anti-competitive business practices, its treatment of workers, offering counterfeit or plagiarized products, objectionable content of its books, tax and subsidy deals with governments supplying law enforcement with facial recognition surveillance tools; forming cloud computing partnerships with the CIA; leading customers away from bookshops; adversely impacting the environment; placing a low priority on warehouse conditions for workers; actively opposing unionization efforts; remotely deleting content purchased by Amazon Kindle users; taking public subsidies; seeking to patent its 1-Click technology; engaging in anti-competitive actions and price discrimination; and reclassifying LGBTQ books as adult content. Criticism has also concerned various decisions over whether to censor or publish content such as the WikiLeaks website, works containing libel, anti-LGBT merchandise, and material facilitating dog fighting, cockfighting, or pedophile activities.

An article published by Time in the wake of social media website Parler's termination of service by Amazon Web Service highlights the power companies like Amazon now have over the internet. In December 2011, Amazon faced a backlash from small businesses for running a one-day deal to promote its new Price Check app. Shoppers who used the app to check prices in a brick-and-mortar store were offered a 5% discount to purchase the same item from Amazon. Companies like Groupon, eBay and Taap have countered Amazon's promotion by offering $10 off from its products.

The company has also faced accusations of putting undue pressure on suppliers to maintain and extend its profitability. One effort to squeeze the most vulnerable book publishers was known within the company as the Gazelle Project, after Bezos suggested, according to Brad Stone, "that Amazon should approach these small publishers the way a cheetah would pursue a sickly gazelle." In July 2014, the Federal Trade Commission launched a lawsuit against the company alleging it was promoting in-app purchases to children, which were being transacted without parental consent. In 2019, Amazon banned selling skin-lightening products after pushback from Minnesota health and environmental activists. In 2022, a lawsuit filed by state attorney-general Letitia James was dismissed by the New York state court of appeals. After the COVID-19 pandemic, Amazon faced criticism for complying, under pressure from the Biden Administration, to "reduce the visibility" of books critical of the COVID-19 vaccine, which was revealed after Rep. Jim Jordan (acting on behalf of the House Judiciary Committee) subpoenaed emails between the company and the Biden Administration.

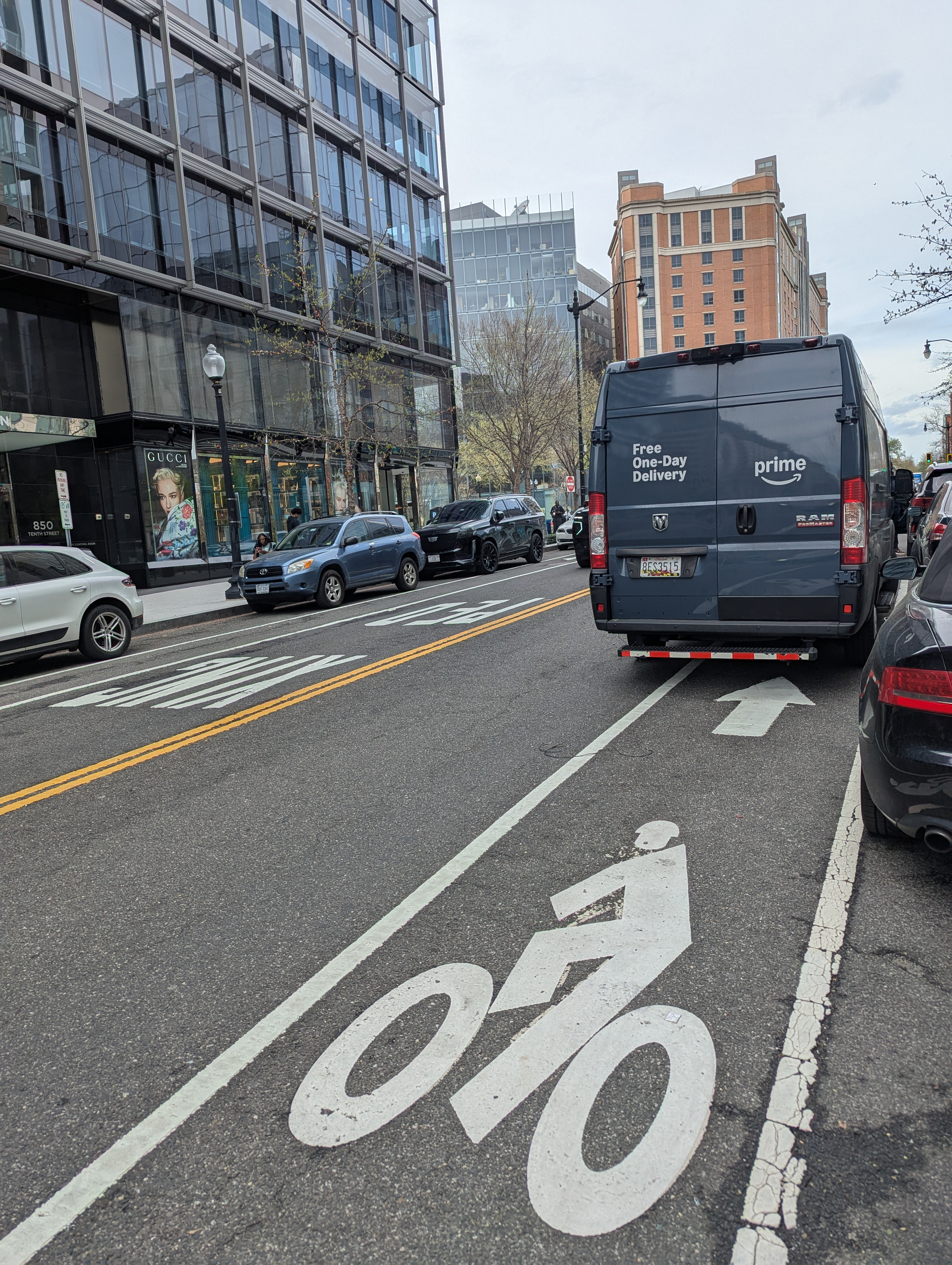
An Amazon Prime truck blocking a bike lane and double parking in Washington, D.C.

Amazon Prime has been criticized for its vehicles systemically double parking, blocking bike lanes, and otherwise violating traffic laws while dropping off packages, contributing to traffic congestion and endangering other road users.

Jane Friedman discovered six listings of books fraudulently using her name, on Amazon and Goodreads. Amazon and Goodreads resisted removing the fraudulent titles until the author's complaints went viral on social media, in a blog post titled "I Would Rather See My Books Get Pirated Than This (Or: Why Goodreads and Amazon Are Becoming Dumpster Fires)."

In 2024, following years of criticism for providing law enforcement footage in the custody of Ring (a home security company owned by Amazon) without a warrant, Ring has halted this practice. It received cautious praise from privacy-focused organizations such as the Electronic Frontier Foundation for this change.

In February 2025, Sky accused Amazon of not doing enough to prevent the piracy of its sports rights via "jailbroken" Fire Sticks.

Project Nimbus is a contract by which Amazon and Google provide Israel and its military with artificial intelligence, machine learning, and other cloud-computing services. The contract has been criticized by shareholders and employees concerned that the project may lead to abuses of Palestinian human rights in the Israeli–Palestinian conflict. In October 2025, Amazon suspended an employee who posted messages to the company's Slack and wrote a letter to Andy Jassy criticizing Nimbus.

On July 22, 2025, Amazon announced its plan to acquire San Francisco-based startup Bee AI. Bee produces a wristband, similar to most modern smartwatches, equipped with AI and microphones. The wristband is capable of providing summaries of conversations and reminders of tasks, effectively serving as a 24/7 note taker. News outlets criticize the fact that the devices saves transcripts, potentially utilizing it to train generative AI models which require vast quantities of data.

In January 2026, Amazon sent a notice out to cloud staffers in an apparent error acknowledging “organizational changes” at the company. The note also mentioned a "Project Dawn" which was cancelled, although it is unclear what the project is about.

== Anti-competitive practices ==
=== One-click patent ===
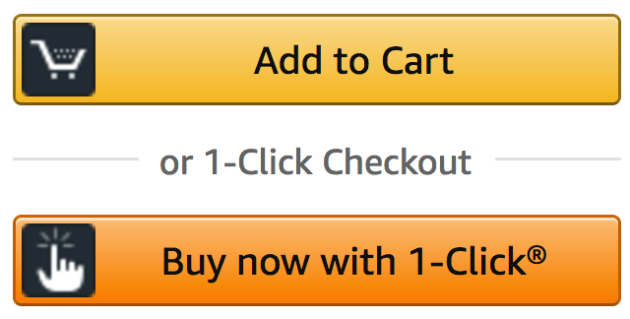
Amazon.com offers the option to add an item to a user's cart or purchase it immediately with 1-Click.

The company has been criticized for its alleged use of patents as a competitive hindrance; its "1-Click patent" may be the best-known example. Amazon's use of the 1-click patent against competitor Barnes & Noble's website led the Free Software Foundation to announce a boycott of Amazon in December 1999, which ended in September 2002. On February 22, 2000, the company patented an Internet-based customer referral system known as an affiliate program. Industry leaders Tim O'Reilly and Charlie Jackson spoke out against the patents and O'Reilly published an open letter to Amazon CEO Jeff Bezos, petitioning Bezos to "avoid any attempts to limit the further development of Internet commerce". O'Reilly collected 10,000 signatures, and Bezos responded with an open letter. The protest ended with O'Reilly and Bezos visiting Washington, D.C. to lobby for patent reform. The company received a patent, "Method and system for conducting a discussion relating to an item on Internet discussion boards", on February 25, 2003. On May 12, 2006, the USPTO ordered a re-examination of the 1-Click patent based on a request by actor Peter Calveley, who cited an earlier e-commerce patent and the Digicash electronic cash system.

=== Canadian site ===
Amazon has a Canadian website in English and French. Until a March 2010 ruling, however, it was prevented from operating any headquarters, servers, fulfillment centers or call centers in Canada by that country's legal restrictions on foreign-owned booksellers. Amazon's Canadian site originates in the United States, and Amazon has an agreement with Canada Post to handle distribution in Canada and for the use of the crown corporation's Mississauga, Ontario, shipping facility. The launch of Amazon.ca generated controversy in Canada. In 2002, the Canadian Booksellers Association and Indigo Books and Music sought a court ruling that Amazon's partnership with Canada Post represented an attempt to circumvent Canadian law. The litigation was dropped in 2004.

In January 2017, doormats with the Indian flag were offered on the Amazon Canada website. Use of the Indian flag in this way is considered offensive to the Indian community and a violation of the Flag Code of India. Indian Minister of External Affairs Sushma Swaraj threatened a visa embargo for Amazon officials if Amazon did not issue an unconditional apology and withdraw all such products. According to deputy commissioner for deceptive marketing practices Josephine Palumbo, Amazon.ca was required by the Canadian Competition Bureau to pay a $1 million penalty and $100,000 in costs for failing to provide "truth in advertising". The fine was levied because some products on Amazon.ca had an artificially-high list price, making a lower selling price appear attractive and giving the company an unfair competitive edge over other retailers. This is a frequent practice among some retailers, and the fine was intended to "send a clear message [to the industry] that unsubstantiated savings claims will not be tolerated". The bureau indicated that Amazon has made changes to ensure that its regular prices are more accurate.

=== BookSurge ===
Sales representatives of Amazon's BookSurge division began contacting publishers of print on demand (POD) titles in March 2008 to inform them that for Amazon to continue selling their POD books, they must sign agreements with Amazon's BookSurge POD company. Publishers were told that eventually, the only POD titles Amazon would sell would be those printed by BookSurge. Some publishers felt that this ultimatum was monopolistic, and questioned the ethics of the move and its legality under anti-trust law.

=== Direct selling ===
In 2008, Amazon UK was criticized for attempting to prevent publishers from direct selling at a discount from their own websites. Amazon argued that it should be able to pay publishers based on the lower prices on their websites, rather than on the recommended retail price (RRP). Amazon UK was also criticized that year by the British publishing community after withdrawing from sale key titles published by Hachette Livre UK, possibly to pressure Hachette to provide discounts described as unreasonable. Curtis Brown managing director Jonathan Lloyd said that "publishers, authors, and agents are 100% behind [Hachette]. Someone has to draw a line in the sand. Publishers have given 1% a year away to retailers, so where does it stop? Using authors as a financial football is disgraceful." In August 2013, Amazon agreed to end its price-parity policy for marketplace sellers in the European Union in response to investigations by the UK Office of Fair Trade and Germany's Federal Cartel Office.

=== Price control ===
After the announcement of the Apple iPad on January 27, 2010, Macmillan Publishers began a pricing dispute with Amazon about electronic publications. Macmillan asked Amazon to accept a new pricing scheme it had worked out with Apple, raising the price of e-books from $9.99 to $15. Amazon responded by pulling all Macmillan books (electronic and physical) from its website, although affiliates selling the books were still listed. On January 31, 2010, Amazon "capitulated" to Macmillan's pricing request.

In 2014, Amazon and Hachette became involved in a dispute about agency pricing, when an agent (such as Hachette) determines the price of a book; normally, Amazon dictates the discount level of a book. High-profile authors became involved; hundreds of writers, including Stephen King and John Grisham, signed a petition: "We encourage Amazon in the strongest possible terms to stop harming the livelihood of the authors on whom it has built its business. None of us, neither readers nor authors, benefit when books are taken hostage." Author Ursula K. Le Guin said about Amazon's practice of making Hachette books more difficult to buy on its site, "We're talking about censorship: deliberately making a book hard or impossible to get, 'disappearing' an author." Falling sales of Hachette books on Amazon indicated that its policies probably deterred customers. On August 11, 2014, Amazon removed the option to pre-order Captain America: The Winter Soldier to control the online pricing of Disney films; the company had used similar tactics with Warner Bros. The conflict was resolved in late 2014, with neither side making concessions. Amazon again began to block pre-orders of Disney films in February 2017, just before Moana and Rogue One were due to be released for the home market.

The law firm Hagens Berman filed a lawsuit in the New York district court in January 2021, saying that Amazon colluded with leading publishers to keep e-book prices artificially high. Connecticut announced that it was investigating Amazon for potential anti-competitive behavior in its marketing of e-books.

=== Removal of competitors' products ===
On October 1, 2015, Amazon announced that Apple TV and Google Chromecast products were banned from sale by all merchants effective October 29 of that year. The company said that this was to prevent "customer confusion", since those devices did not support Amazon Prime Video. The move was criticized as an attempt to suppress products competing with Amazon Fire TV products.

In May 2017, it was reported that Apple and Amazon were nearing an agreement to offer Prime Video on Apple TV and allow the product to return to the retailer. Prime Video launched on Apple TV on December 6 of that year, with Amazon beginning to sell Apple TVs again shortly thereafter.

Amazon is known to remove products for trivial policy violations by third-party sellers which compete with Amazon's home-grown brands. To compete for product placement where Amazon's own brands are featured prominently, third-party sellers often list themselves with Amazon's Prime program; this increases costs, shrinking profit margins.

Amazon has suppressed other Google products, including Google Home (which competes with Amazon Echo), Pixel phones, and products from Google subsidiary Nest Labs (despite the Nest Learning Thermostat's integration support for Amazon Alexa). Google announced on December 6, 2017, that it would block YouTube from the Amazon Echo Show and Amazon Fire TV products. In December 2017, Amazon said that it intended to begin offering Chromecast again. Nest said that it would no longer offer stock to Amazon until the company committed to offering its entire product line.

In April 2019, Amazon announced that it would add Chromecast support to its Prime Video mobile app and release its Android TV app more widely; Google announced that it would, in return, restore access to YouTube on Fire TV (but not the Echo Show). Prime Video for Chromecast and YouTube for Fire TV were both released July 9, 2019. In December 2019, after the acquisition of Honey (a browser extension which applies online coupons to online stores) by PayPal, Amazon began to warn users that Honey was a security risk.

=== Apple partnership ===
In November 2018, Amazon reached an agreement with Apple Inc. to sell selected products through the company, selected Apple authorized resellers, and vendors who meet specific criteria. As a result of this partnership, only Apple authorized resellers and vendors who purchase $2.5 million in refurbished stock from Apple every 90 days (via the Amazon Renewed program) may sell Apple products on Amazon. The partnership was criticized by independent resellers, who believe that it restricts their ability to sell refurbished Apple products on Amazon at low cost. In August 2019, The Verge reported that Amazon was being investigated by the FTC because of the deal.

=== Marketplace participant and owner ===
Amazon owns a dominant marketplace and is a retail seller in that marketplace. The company uses data from the marketplace which is unavailable to other retailers in that marketplace to determine which products to produce in-house and at what price point. Amazon markets products under AmazonBasics, Lark & Ro, and other private-label brands. U.S. presidential candidate Elizabeth Warren proposed forcing Amazon to sell AmazonBasics and Whole Foods Market, where Amazon competes against other sellers as a brick-and-mortar retailer.

Tim O'Reilly, comparing Ingram's business with Amazon's, noted that Amazon's focus on the customer debilitates the retail ecosystem (which includes sellers, manufacturers, and its own employees); Ingram sought to innovate and build on behalf of all the stakeholders in its marketplace it operates in. According to O'Reilly, Amazon's behavior is driven by its need for growth. Third-party sellers have criticized Amazon's rent-seeking behavior, which includes increasing the cost of doing business on its platform, abusing its dominant market position to manipulate pricing, copying popular products from third-party retailers, and unjustifiably promoting its own brands.

In October 2021, citing leaked internal documents, Reuters reported that Amazon harvested and studied data about its sellers' sales and used the data to identify lucrative markets and launch Amazon replacement products in India. The data included information about returns, clothing sizes, and the number of product views on its website. Rival sales figures are not available to Amazon's sellers. The company also tweaked search results to favor Amazon's private-label products. The strategy's impact reached well beyond India; hundreds of Solimo-branded household items are available in the US. One casualty is the clothing brand John Miller, owned by India's Kishore Biyani. In October 2022, a £900 million class-action lawsuit was filed in the United Kingdom against Amazon over a buy box on its website which "favours products sold by Amazon itself, or by retailers who pay Amazon for handling their logistics".

=== Antitrust complaints ===
The European Commission began an investigation in June 2015 of clauses in Amazon's e-book distribution agreements, which may have breached EU antitrust law by making it harder for other e-book platforms to compete. The investigation ended in May 2017, when the commission rendered binding Amazon's commitments not to use or enforce the clauses.

In July 2019 and November 2020, the European Commission began in-depth investigations of Amazon's use of marketplace seller data and possible preferential treatment of Amazon's retail offers and those of marketplace sellers which use Amazon's logistics and delivery services. It was charged that Amazon relied on nonpublic data from third-party sellers to benefit its retail business, violating competition law in the European Economic Area. On June 11, 2020, the European Union announced that it would prosecute Amazon for its treatment of third-party e-commerce sellers; California began an investigation around the same time. In December 2019, the Competition Commission of India suspended an approval for the takeover of Future Retail and levied a ₹200 crore. The commission learned from internal Amazon emails that it intended to acquire the company solely to take advantage of foreign-investment relaxation. Amazon appealed the suspension; the CCI defended it in March 2022, citing misrepresentation on Amazon's part.

In July 2020, Amazon, Apple, Google and Meta were accused of using excessive power and anti-competitive strategies to quash potential competitors. Their CEOs appeared in a July 29 teleconference before the U.S. House Antitrust Subcommittee. In October 2020, the subcommittee released a report accusing Amazon of holding a monopoly e-commerce position to unfairly compete with sellers on its platform. In a March 2022 letter to bipartisan leaders of the Senate Judiciary Committee, the Justice Department endorsed legislation forbidding large digital platforms from disadvantaging competitors' products and services: "The [Justice] Department views the rise of dominant platforms as presenting a threat to open markets and competition, with risks for consumers, businesses, innovation, resiliency, global competitiveness, and our democracy". The Attorney General of California sued Amazon in September 2022 after the state's investigation which began in 2020, alleging that its contracts with third-party sellers and wholesalers inflated prices and stifled competition; merchants are coerced into contracts which prevent them from offering their products elsewhere, on other websites, for lower prices.

On November 11, 2026, the Japan Fair Trade Commission approved a commitment plan submitted by Amazon's Japanese subsidiary following an investigation into its pricing requirements for third-party sellers. Sellers had been required to match or undercut competing websites' prices to qualify for placement as recommended offers. Under the plan, Amazon Japan agreed to display the lowest-priced available offer and a route to purchase when no seller met that price benchmark. The changes were to be implemented within six months, with compliance monitored for five years. The approval did not constitute a finding that Amazon Japan had violated antimonopoly law.

=== Stagnation of subsidiaries ===
Amazon's buying up of subsidiaries has reportedly led to stagnation and a lack of development or innovation in them, particularly Goodreads; an Input Magazine article called the platform "ancient and terrible", saying that it resembles an early-2000s digital library with no developments to accommodate the evolution of book-metadata acquisition or online reader activity. New Statesman also criticized Goodreads, calling it "stagnated" and a "monopoly on the discussion of new books": "[W]hat should be a cozy, pleasant corner of the internet has become a monster."

=== Effects on small businesses ===
Due to its size and economies of scale, Amazon can undercut small local shopkeepers. Stacy Mitchell and Olivia Lavecchia, researchers with the Institute for Local Self-Reliance, say that this has caused many local, small-scale shopkeepers to close in a number of cities and towns in the United States.

Amazon India, subject to foreign investment regulations barring e-commerce firms selling directly to customers, can only collect fees from vendors selling products. In 2021, Reuters investigation alleged that Amazon side-stepped regulations meant to protect small businesses, favouring 33 large retailers who accounted for two-third of all sales on its platform. Amidst marketing push for being a haven for small businesses, Amazon's "special merchants" program with Ashok Patni's Appario and Narayana Murthy's Cloudtail accounted for 35% of all sales.

== Products and services ==
=== Fraudulent book listings ===
Jane Friedman discovered six listings of books fraudulently using her name on Amazon and Goodreads; the companies resisted removing the fraudulent titles until the author's complaints went viral on social media in a blog post, "I Would Rather See My Books Get Pirated Than This (Or: Why Goodreads and Amazon Are Becoming Dumpster Fires)."

=== Animal cruelty ===
Amazon had carried two cockfighting magazines and two dog-fighting videos. The Humane Society of the United States (HSUS), saying that their sale violated federal law, sued the company. An August 2007 campaign to boycott Amazon received attention in the wake of a dog-fighting case involving NFL quarterback Michael Vick. Marburger Publishing agreed to settle with the Humane Society in May 2008 by asking Amazon to stop selling its magazine, The Game Cock; The Feathered Warrior, the second magazine named in the lawsuit, remained available.

Mercy for Animals has said that Amazon permits sales of foie gras, which has been banned in California and several countries, on its website. As a result, animal-welfare groups began a movement known as "Amazon Cruelty".

=== Items prohibited by UK law ===
In December 2015, The Guardian published an exposé of Amazon sales which violated British law. Items included a pepper-spray gun (sold by amazon.co.uk), acid, stun guns and a concealed cutting weapon (sold by Amazon Marketplace vendors); all are considered prohibited weapons in the UK. The Guardian also released a video describing some of the weapons. Likewise, brass catchers, illegal in New South Wales, are sold by Amazon.com.au.

=== Antisemitic content ===
A January 2008 article in the Czech weekly Tyden called attention to shirts sold by Amazon which were emblazoned with "I Love Heinrich Himmler" and "I Love Reinhard Heydrich". Amazon spokesperson Patricia Smith told Tyden, "Our catalog contains millions of items. With such a large number, unexpected merchandise may get onto the Web." Smith also told Tyden that the company did not intend to stop working with Direct Collection, producer of the T-shirts. After pressure from the World Jewish Congress (WJC), Amazon announced that it had removed from its website the Himmler and Heydrich T-shirts and "I Love Hitler" T-shirts sold for women and children. After the WJC intervention, other items (including a Hitler Youth Knife emblazoned with the Nazi slogan "Blood and Honor" and a 1933 German SS Officer Dagger distributed by Knife-Kingdom) were also removed from Amazon.com.

An October 2013 report in the British online magazine The Kernel said that Amazon.com was selling books defending Holocaust denial, shipping them to customers in countries where Holocaust denial is prohibited by law. That month, the WJC called on Amazon CEO Jeff Bezos to remove books denying the Holocaust and promoting antisemitism, white supremacy, racism or sexism. "No one should profit from the sale of such vile and offensive hate literature. Many Holocaust survivors are deeply offended by the fact that the world's largest online retailer is making money from selling such material," WJC executive vice-president Robert Singer wrote in a letter to Bezos.

Although Nazi paraphernalia was still listed on Amazon in the US and Canada in 2016, the WJC announced on March 9, 2017, that Amazon had complied with it and other Jewish organizations by removing from sale the cited Holocaust-denial works. The WJC offered assistance in identifying Holocaust-denial works among Amazon's offerings in the future.

The Central Council of Jews in Germany denounced Amazon in July 2019 for continuing to sell items glorifying the Nazis. The company was caught in December of that year selling Auschwitz-themed Christmas-tree ornaments on its platform, printed on demand with stock images of the concentration camp from a third-party seller; Amazon eventually removed the ornaments from all its platforms. Auschwitz Memorial, which maintains the concentration camp for historical and educational purposes, said that it had found a "disturbing online product from another seller – a computer mousepad bearing the image of a freight train used for deporting people to the concentration camps." Wired journalist Louise Matsakis called the Holocaust-themed products "the byproduct of an increasingly automated e-commerce landscape", noting that the items were print-on-demand and Amazon became aware of them after offended customers reported their sale.

Amazon removed all new and used print and digital copies of The Turner Diaries (an antisemitic and racist dystopian novel) in late 2020 from its bookselling platform, including its AbeBooks and Book Depository subsidiaries, effectively removing it from the digital bookselling market. The company cited the book's connection with the QAnon movement as the reason, and had already purged a number of self-published and small-press titles connected with QAnon from its platform. Amazon subsidiary Goodreads purged the metadata from all editions of The Turner Diaries, replacing the author and title fields with "NOT A BOOK" (capitalization intended), a designation normally used by the platform to weed non-book items with ISBN numbers, as well as plagiarized titles, from its catalogue.

Amazon began offering access through its Prime streaming service in 2022 to the documentary film, Hebrews to Negroes: Wake Up Black America, which had been endorsed by Kyrie Irving. The film contains a number of conspiracy theories, including Holocaust denial and the theory that European Jews were responsible for the Atlantic slave trade. Variety defended Amazon: "The radio silence [of Amazon] shouldn't be misinterpreted as indifference. To the contrary, insiders say how to properly handle "Hebrews" [the film] has been the subject of endless debates at numerous meetings, some of which have involved the top brass at Amazon ... [W]hile the company has a long and arguably inconsistent track record when it comes to policing controversial content on its own platform, "Hebrews" has been particularly challenging given how high-profile the Irving saga became. Few execs from the company’s headquarters in Seattle or its studio business in Culver City have been spared an earful from those wondering why the company is selling such vile material on its website." CEO Andy Jassy said that the film had to remain on Amazon even if the viewpoint was objectionable. Stephen A. Smith criticized former Amazon CEO Jeff Bezos for the decision: "Jeff Bezos, you’re supposed to be a better man than that. Get rid of that. Get that off your platform, please, since all of this noise is being made."

=== Pedophile guide ===
On November 10, 2010, a controversy arose about the marketing by Amazon of an e-book by Phillip R. Greaves entitled The Pedophile's Guide to Love and Pleasure: A Child-lover's Code of Conduct. Readers threatened to boycott Amazon for selling the book, which was described by critics as a "pedophile guide". Amazon initially defended its action, saying that it "believes it is censorship not to sell certain books simply because we or others believe their message is objectionable" and "supported the right of every individual to make their own purchasing decisions". The company later removed the book. According to the San Francisco Chronicle, Amazon "defended the book, then removed it, then reinstated it, and then removed it again".

American Booksellers for Free Expression president Christopher Finan said that Amazon had the right to sell the book; it is not child pornography or legally obscene, since it does not have pictures. Enough Is Enough (a child-safety organization), however, said that the book should be removed and "lends the impression that child abuse is normal". People for the Ethical Treatment of Animals (PETA), citing the removal of The Pedophile's Guide from Amazon, urged the website to also remove books on dog-fighting from its catalogue.

Greaves was arrested on December 20, 2010, at his Pueblo, Colorado home on a felony warrant issued by the Polk County Sheriff's Office in Lakeland, Florida. Detectives from the county's Internet Crimes Division ordered a signed copy of Greaves' book and had it shipped to the agency's jurisdiction, where it violated state obscenity laws. According to Sheriff Grady Judd, Greaves violated local laws prohibiting the distribution of "obscene material depicting minors engaged in harmful conduct" (a third-degree felony). Greaves pleaded no contest to the charges and was released on probation, with his previous jail time counting as time served.

=== Counterfeit products ===
On October 16, 2016, Apple filed a trademark-infringement case against Mobile Star LLC for selling counterfeit Apple products to Amazon. In the suit, Apple provided evidence that Amazon was selling counterfeit Apple products and advertising them as genuine. Apple had a 90-percent success rate in identifying counterfeit products, which Amazon sold without determining if they were genuine. Mobile Star LLC settled with Apple for an undisclosed amount on April 27, 2017.

The sale of counterfeit products by Amazon has attracted widespread notice, with purchases marked as fulfilled by third parties and those shipped directly from Amazon warehouses found to be counterfeit. This has included products sold directly by Amazon, marked as "ships from and sold by Amazon.com". Counterfeit charging cables sold on Amazon as purported Apple products have been found to be a fire hazard. Selling Apple products is now a restricted category on Amazon, meaning resellers have to get approval from the brand to sell those products on the site.

Counterfeits have included a variety of products, from big-ticket items to tweezers, gloves, and umbrellas. More recently, this has spread to Amazon's newer grocery services. Counterfeiting was reportedly a problem for artists and small businesses, whose products were rapidly copied for sale on the site. Companies such as Birkenstock and Nike have pulled their products from Amazon.

Seller accounts on Amazon were set by default to use "commingled inventory", a practice that encourages counterfeiting. With commingled inventory, the goods a seller sends to Amazon are mixed with those of the producer of the product and those of all other sellers supplying what is supposed to be the same product. Buyers receive goods from this mixed pool of inventory, shipped to them from whichever storage unit is most convenient for delivery and cost efficiency (e.g., to reduce costs imposed by moving goods between countries that impose import-export duties). Once counterfeit goods are mixed into the pool of inventory, a vendor of legitimate products cannot be sure that the customer won't receive a fake or defective product instead, and customer complaints cannot be addressed effectively by suppliers (and Amazon), since it becomes unknown exactly what source of product the customer is complaining about.

In 2023, Amazon said it spent more than $1.2 billion and employed more than 15,000 people that were dedicated to protecting customers from counterfeiting, fraud, and other abuse. Between 2020 and 2023, the Amazon Counterfeit Crimes Unit pursued more than 21,000 bad actors through litigation and criminal referrals to law enforcement. The company posts updated numbers in its annual Brand Protection Report.

In June 2019, BuzzFeed reported that some products identified on the site as "Amazon's choice" were low quality and had a history of customer complaints and evidence of product-review manipulation. The Wall Street Journal reported in August 2019 that it had found more than 4,000 items for sale on Amazon's site that had been declared unsafe by federal agencies, had misleading labels, or had been banned by federal regulators. In the wake of the WSJ investigation, three U.S. senators – Richard Blumenthal, Ed Markey, and Bob Menendez – sent an open letter to Bezos demanding action against the sale of unsafe items on the site: "Unquestionably, Amazon is falling short of its commitment to keeping safe those consumers who use its massive platform." The letter questioned the company's practices and gave Bezos a September 29, 2019, deadline to respond: "We call on you to immediately remove from the platform all the problematic products examined in the recent WSJ report; explain how you are going about this process; conduct a sweeping internal investigation of your enforcement and consumer safety policies; and institute changes that will continue to keep unsafe products off your platform." Earlier that month, Blumenthal and Menendez had sent Bezos a letter about the BuzzFeed report. In December 2019, The Wall Street Journal reported that people were retrieving trash from dumpsters and selling it on Amazon as new. The reporters learned that it was easy for a seller to set up an account and sell cleaned-up junk as new. In addition to trash, sellers were obtaining inventory from clearance bins, thrift stores, and pawn shops.

In August 2020, an appeals court in California ruled that Amazon could be held liable for unsafe products sold on its website. A Californian bought a replacement laptop battery which caught fire, giving her third-degree burns.

In September 2025, Amazon announced that they would be ending their inventory commingling practice, as of March 31, 2026. Commingling had been the cause of major counterfeiting and quality control problems. Geekwire reported that among all the "big announcements" at the Amazon Accelerate annual sellers' event in 2025, the announcement of the end of inventory commingling received more applause than any other – even the availability of the company's new artificial intelligence tools.

==== Media ====
American copyright lobbyists have accused Amazon of facilitating the sale of unlicensed CDs and DVDs, particularly in the Chinese market. The Chinese government responded by announcing plans to increase regulation of Amazon, Apple and Taobao in relation to Internet copyright infringement. Amazon has shut down third-party distributors due to pressure from the National Copyright Administration of China (NCAC).

Amazon has been caught selling counterfeit books, which mimic an authentic edition of a published work but are not authorized for publication by the copyright holder; one example is The Sanford Guide to Antimicrobial Therapy, a non-fiction medical book. According to David Streitfeld of The New York Times, "Amazon takes a hands-off approach to what goes on in its bookstore, never checking the authenticity, much less the quality, of what it sells. It does not oversee the sellers who have flocked to its site in any organized way. That has resulted in a kind of lawlessness. Publishers, writers and groups such as the Authors Guild said counterfeiting of books on Amazon had surged. The company has been reactive rather than proactive in dealing with the issue, often taking action only when a buyer complains. Many times, they added, there is nowhere to appeal and their only recourse is to integrate even more closely with Amazon."

This was not the first instance of a counterfeit book appearing on Amazon. According to the New York Post, the problem also encompasses plagiarized books; author Martin Kleppmann said that Amazon was selling pirated copies of his textbook with "pages overlapping" and bleeding ink, making the book unreadable and sparking negative reviews. In 2019, InterVarsity Press announced that counterfeiters had sold $240,000 worth of fake copies of Tish Harrison Warren's Liturgy of the Ordinary on Amazon—as many as 20,000 copies, compared to an estimated 121,000 legitimate copies sold by IVP to that point.

According to a 2019 Vox article, Amazon benefits from the sale of counterfeit books. The article citing a small-press publisher forced to partner with Amazon to return legitimate books to the market: "Bill Pollock, founder of the San Francisco-based programming and science guide publisher No Starch, told the New York Times that this solution was just putting even more onus on rights holders to protect themselves: 'Why should we be responsible for policing Amazon for fakes? That’s their job'. No Starch said that it was spending '$3,000 a month and rising' to keep its search placement higher than the people who are copying it."

=== Third-party marketplace ===
A 2019 Wall Street Journal (WSJ) investigation found third-party retailers selling over 4,000 unsafe, banned, or deceptively-labeled products on Amazon.com. When customers sued Amazon for unsafe products sold by third-party sellers on Amazon.com, Amazon's legal defense has been that it is not the seller and cannot be held liable. Wirecutter reported in 2020 that over a several-month period, they "were able to purchase items through Amazon Prime that were either confirmed counterfeits, lookalikes unsafe for use, or otherwise misrepresented." CNBC reported in 2019 that Amazon third-party sellers regularly sold expired food products, and the size of Amazon Marketplace has made policing the platform difficult for the company.

By 2020, third-party sellers accounted for 54 percent of sales on Amazon platforms. In 2019, Amazon earned $54 billion in fees from third-party retailers for seller services.

=== Plagiarism in Kindle Direct Publishing ===
Nora Roberts, an American romance author who has had a number of titles of hers plagiarized and re-published through Kindle Direct Publishing, said about Amazon's self-publishing branch: "I'm getting one hell of an education on the sick, greedy, opportunistic culture that games Amazon's absurdly weak system. And everything I learn enrages me ... this culture, this ugly underbelly of legitimate self-publishing is all about content. More, more, more, fast, fast, fast!". Roberts said during an interview with The Guardian that she would sue her unnamed plagiarists. In 2019, the Authors Guild said that "the way KDP and KU [Kindle Unlimited] are set up, which attracts scammers who take advantage of weaknesses in the system to repackage other authors' books and anthologies ... they pass them off as them as 'new' works". Goodreads and Google Books often retain metadata for counterfeits and plagiarized titles after Amazon removes them from its sales platforms, which leads to improper author attribution, ambiguity and reader confusion.

Amazon maintains that it checks for plagiarism by monitoring user accounts and checking uploaded files, although critics say that Amazon's system is not robust enough to handle issues such as identity theft, minors accessing the platform, or internet anonymity. The Urban Writers said that "Amazon is extremely sensitive about plagiarized work and, if flagged, your account could be deactivated."

Other writers and reports have been more critical of Amazon's response to plagiarism, noting a number of cases where Amazon did nothing to stop one or more plagiarists from uploading copyrighted files and claiming them as their own, claiming to be the author themselves, uploading stolen information from an author (such as tax numbers or a home address) to falsely claim their identity, claiming public domain works under their own name, and making up names to avoid legal consequences. CNET writer Michelle Starr described a 2012 case where "sci-fi authors C.H. Cherryh and John Scalzi issued Amazon with DMCA takedown notices for books of theirs that one Ibnul Jaif Farabi had uploaded, with titles slightly changed, under his own name. He had also done the same thing with works by deceased authors, such as Robert Heinlein and Arthur C. Clarke, who, of course, are slightly too deceased to notice."

In most cases, Amazon stops publishing (and selling) the titles while retaining metadata on websites such as Goodreads. Rachel Ann Nunes, a writer of Mormon fiction, said in an interview for The Atlantic that emotional stress and reputation damage were even worse than the financial implications of her books being plagiarized: "I felt like I was being attacked ... and when I went on social media, I didn’t know what would be waiting for me." Nunes said that she had been unable to sleep, gained weight, found herself unable to enjoy writing any more, and paid thousands of dollars in legal fees for attempting to catch her plagiarist, who had a number of aliases and uploaded false information to Amazon's databases.

According to Jonathan Bailey of Plagiarism Today, "Amazon doesn't do much to vet the books it publishes. Plagiarism isn't even mentioned in its KDP help files. What this means is that it's trivial to publish almost anything you want regardless of the quality of the work or, in these cases, how original it is. In fact, many complain that Amazon fails to vet works for even simple issues such as formatting and layout. Though Amazon will, sometimes, remove works that violates their terms of service after they get complaints, they're happy to sell the books and reap the profits until they get such a notice. And, from Amazon's perspective, this is completely legal. They are protected by the Digital Millennium Copyright Act (DMCA) as well as other laws, in particular Section 230 of the Communications Decency Act, that basically mean they are under no obligation to vet or check the works they publish. They are legally free to produce and sell books, physical and digital, regardless of whether they are plagiarized, copyright infringing or otherwise illegal."

Vox journalist Kaitlyn Tiffany investigated a bizarre subset of self-published "celebrity biographies" on Amazon in 2019 which were published under the pen name "Matt Green" by Kindle Direct Publishing which contained plagiarized and unauthorized material, often with typos and grammatical errors. Tiffany defended Amazon's approach to content control, however: "Amazon has already quashed quite a few e-book scams. At first, users could download public domain books from sources like Project Gutenberg, upload them, and sell them to readers who didn't know better. A policy change in 2011 put an end to that. In 2012, Gawker's Max Read came across another good one: hundreds of thousands of books that were just compilations of Wikipedia articles with titles like 'Celebrities with Big Dicks'. One author he found was just publishing random data sets like 'The 2007–2012 Outlook for Tufted Washable Scatter Rugs, Bathmats and Sets That Measure 6-Feet by 9-Feet or Smaller in India'". Tiffany wrote that although Amazon is known for rampant scams in its self-publishing subsidiaries, the company tries its best to stop scams when it becomes aware of them; outright plagiarism and other illegal content is difficult to detect. She cited the use of pen names as a problem and agreed with Jonathan Bailey that the Digital Millennium Copyright Act shields Amazon too much from liability for plagiarism or illegal material in published books.

=== Sale of Wikipedia content as books ===
The German-speaking press and blogosphere have criticized Amazon for selling tens of thousands of print on demand books which reproduced Wikipedia articles. The books are produced by the American company Books LLC and by three Mauritian subsidiaries of the German publisher VDM: Alphascript Publishing, Betascript Publishing and Fastbook Publishing. Amazon did not acknowledge the issue, including requests by some customers to remove the titles from its catalog. The collaboration between amazon.com and VDM began in 2007.

=== Removal of books ===
Amazon removed a book in 2014, described by critics as a "guide to rape", which claimed to reveal how women could be pressured into accepting sexual advances. The company later removed a book by anti-Muslim activist Tommy Robinson.

Its 2015 listing of A MAD World Order, a self-published e-book by Canadian serial killer and rapist Paul Bernardo (who apparently accessed Amazon's self-publishing services through a prison computer), triggered a backlash. Amazon quietly removed the e-book from all its platforms; no print version was ever published, although a metadata record still exists on Goodreads.

The company temporarily banned a book promoting non-mainstream claims about the COVID-19 pandemic and books which promoted COVID-19 cures not sanctioned by US government agencies. In 2021, Amazon removed listings for a 2018 book by conservative philosopher Ryan T. Anderson because it criticized legal protections for transgender people.

=== Kindle content removal ===
The New York Times reported in July 2009 that amazon.com had deleted all customer copies of books published in violation of US copyright laws by MobileReference, including Nineteen Eighty-Four and Animal Farm, from users' Kindles. The action was taken without prior notification or permission from individual users. Customers received a refund of the purchase price and, later, an offer of an Amazon gift certificate or a check for $30. The e-books were initially published by MobileReference on Mobipocket for sale in Australia only, because the works had become public domain in that country. When the e-books were automatically uploaded to Amazon by MobiPocket, however, the territorial restriction was not honored and the book was sold in countries (such as the United States) where the copyright term had not expired.

Author Selena Kitt was a victim of Amazon content removal in December 2010; some of her fiction described incest. Amazon said, "Due to a technical issue, for a short window of time three books were temporarily unavailable for re-download by customers who had previously purchased them. When this was brought to our attention, we fixed the problem ..." in an attempt to defuse user complaints about the deletions.

Late in 2013, the online blog The Kernel published several articles about "an epidemic of filth" on Amazon and other e-book storefronts. Amazon then blocked books dealing with incest, bestiality, child pornography, virginity, monsters, and young sex.

=== Removal of LGBT content ===
In April 2009, it was reported that some lesbian, gay, bisexual, transgender, feminist, and politically-liberal books were excluded from Amazon's sales rankings. Books and other media were flagged as "adult content", including children's books, self-help books, non-fiction, and non-explicit fiction. As a result, works by E. M. Forster, Gore Vidal, Jeanette Winterson and D. H. Lawrence were un-ranked. The change was first reported on the blog of author Mark R. Probst, who posted an e-mail from Amazon describing a policy of de-ranking "adult" material.

Amazon later said that it had no policy of de-ranking lesbian, gay, bisexual and transgender material, blaming the change first on a "glitch" and then on "an embarrassing and ham-fisted cataloging error" affecting 57,310 books; a hacker claimed responsibility for the metadata loss.

In June 2022, Amazon complied with a UAE government demand to restrict LGBTQ products and search results in the Emirates. Searches with keywords such as "pride", "lgbt", "transgender flag" and "lgbt iphone cases" yielded "no results" in the country. Books which included Nagata Kabi's My Lesbian Experience With Loneliness, Roxane Gay's Bad Feminist and Maia Kobabe's Gender Queer: A Memoir were removed.

=== Medical misinformation ===
==== Autism ====
Amazon has sold a number of items, primarily self-published books, with misinformation and pseudoscience about autism spectrum disorder and Asperger's syndrome. According to Wired journalist Matt Reynolds, "[T]o test the system, we uploaded a fake Kindle book titled How To Cure Autism: A guide to using chlorine dioxide to cure autism. The listing was approved within two hours. When creating the book, Amazon's Kindle publishing service suggested a stock cover image that made it appear as though the book had been approved by the FDA." Reynolds wrote that a number of other real Kindle titles promoting bleach cures and other misinformation were already available on Amazon.

Amazon later pulled self-published titles promoting autism-related anti-vaccination theories from its sales platforms, which Lindsey Bever of The Washington Post said bordered on censorship of legal reading material. News outlets, including NBC and CBS, reported that Amazon was removing the books. Science Alert later reported that Amazon was still selling autism-misinformation books. Misinformation about COVID-19 began appearing on Amazon in 2021, and Senator Elizabeth Warren questioned Amazon CEO Andy Jassy about the company's search algorithms promoting misinformation.

==== Vaccines ====
Anti-vaccination and non-evidence-based cancer "cures" have appeared in Amazon books and videos, possibly due to positive reviews posted by supporters of untested methods or gaming of algorithms by truthers. Wired found that Amazon Prime Video contained "pseudoscientific documentaries laden with conspiracy theories and pointing viewers towards unproven treatments".

U.S. Rep. Adam Schiff expressed concern that Amazon was "recommending products and content that discourage parents from vaccinating their children", and the company removed five anti-vaccination documentaries. Amazon also removed 12 books which claimed that bleach could cure conditions which included malaria and childhood autism. This followed an NBC News report about parents who used bleach in an attempt to reverse their children's autism.

=== AWS outages ===
Amazon Web Services, a cloud-computing branch of the company, is used by a large number of major Western corporations and other services such as healthcare, media, food delivery and government. A 2021 series of outages caused the temporary shutdown of most of these platforms, which included Amazon subsidiaries, Netflix, Tinder, McDonald's, Sweetgreen, Disney+ and Roku. Some colleges and universities using AWS had to postpone scheduled tests and assignment due dates because of the outages. Amazon delivery drivers could not properly deliver packages, and Amazon tech products such as its Ring doorbell and Alexa stopped working. The host AWS servers are unknown by the general public, so hacking was not suspected. Journalists Aaron Gregg and Drew Harwell criticized the outages: "[T]he disruptions affect millions of people on an increasingly interconnected Web: we are putting more eggs into fewer and fewer baskets. More eggs get broken that way." The cause of the outages was never explained; to Insider, Amazon called them "an AWS service event that affected Amazon Operations and other customers".

=== Matt Walsh books ===
Conservative political commentator Matt Walsh has published transphobic books, including Johnny the Walrus (a children's allegory about a boy whose parents surgically transition him into a walrus after catching him pretending to be one). Some of the books became bestsellers on Amazon, prompting objections from some Amazon employees, who held a "die-in" protest, saying that media transphobia contributed to hate speech, suicide by trans youth, and misconceptions about trans people. Walsh was amused by the reaction of the Amazon employees, noting that Johnny the Walrus had been listed on Amazon as the company's bestselling LGBT book. The book was later moved to a political category, and some Amazon employees said that books promoting transphobia should be banned from the company's platforms.

== Treatment of workers ==
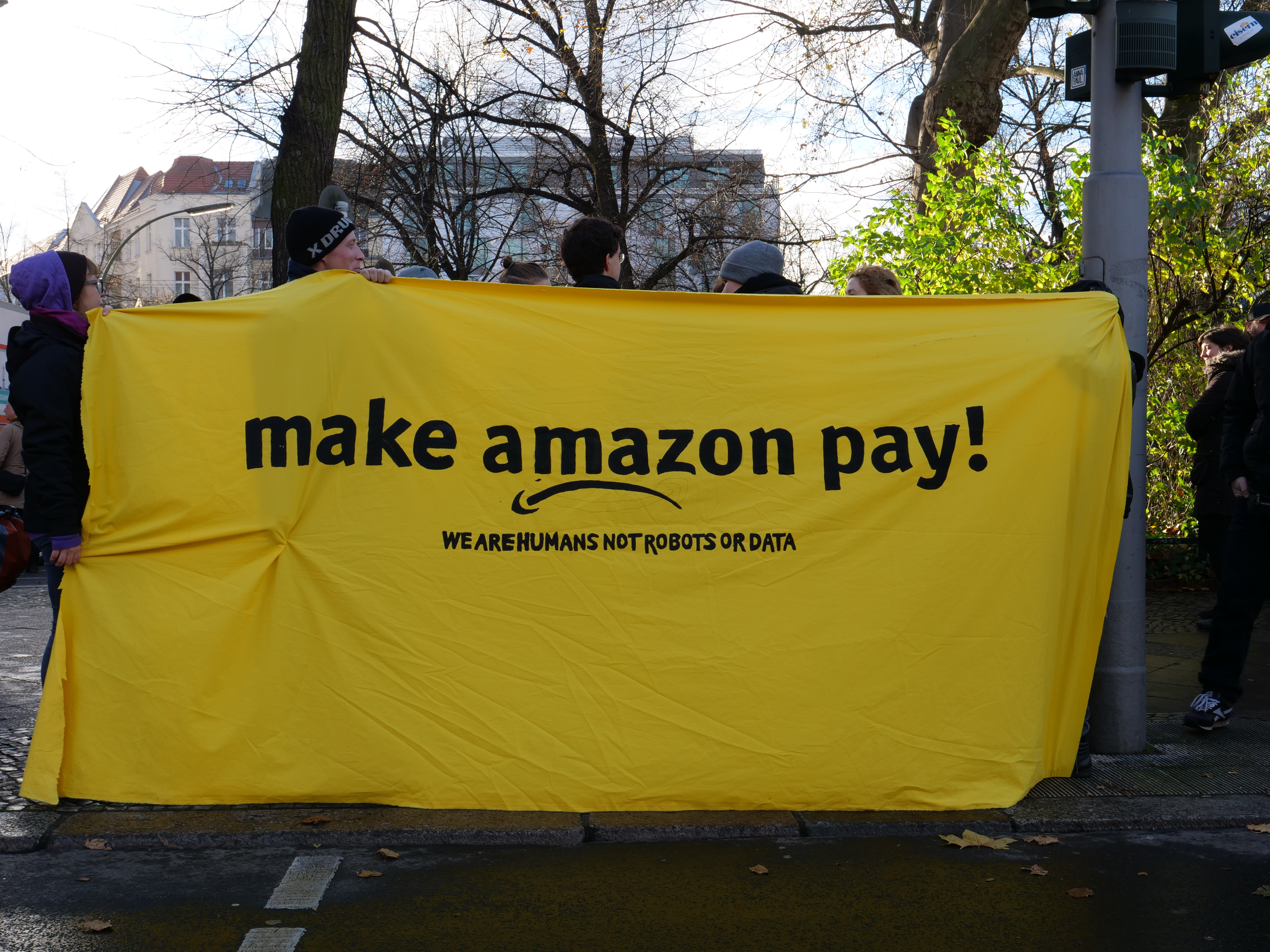
A "Make Amazon Pay!" demonstration in Berlin

Amazon has been criticized for the quality of its working environment and treatment of its workforce. A group known as The FACE (Former And Current Employees) of Amazon has used social media to criticize the company and accuse it of providing poor working conditions.

=== Employee mismanagement ===
Amazon has been accused of mistakenly firing employees on medical leave as no-shows, not fixing an inaccuracy in its payroll systems which resulted in some of its blue- and white-collar employees being underpaid for months, and violating labor law by denying unpaid leave.

=== Opposition to trade unions ===
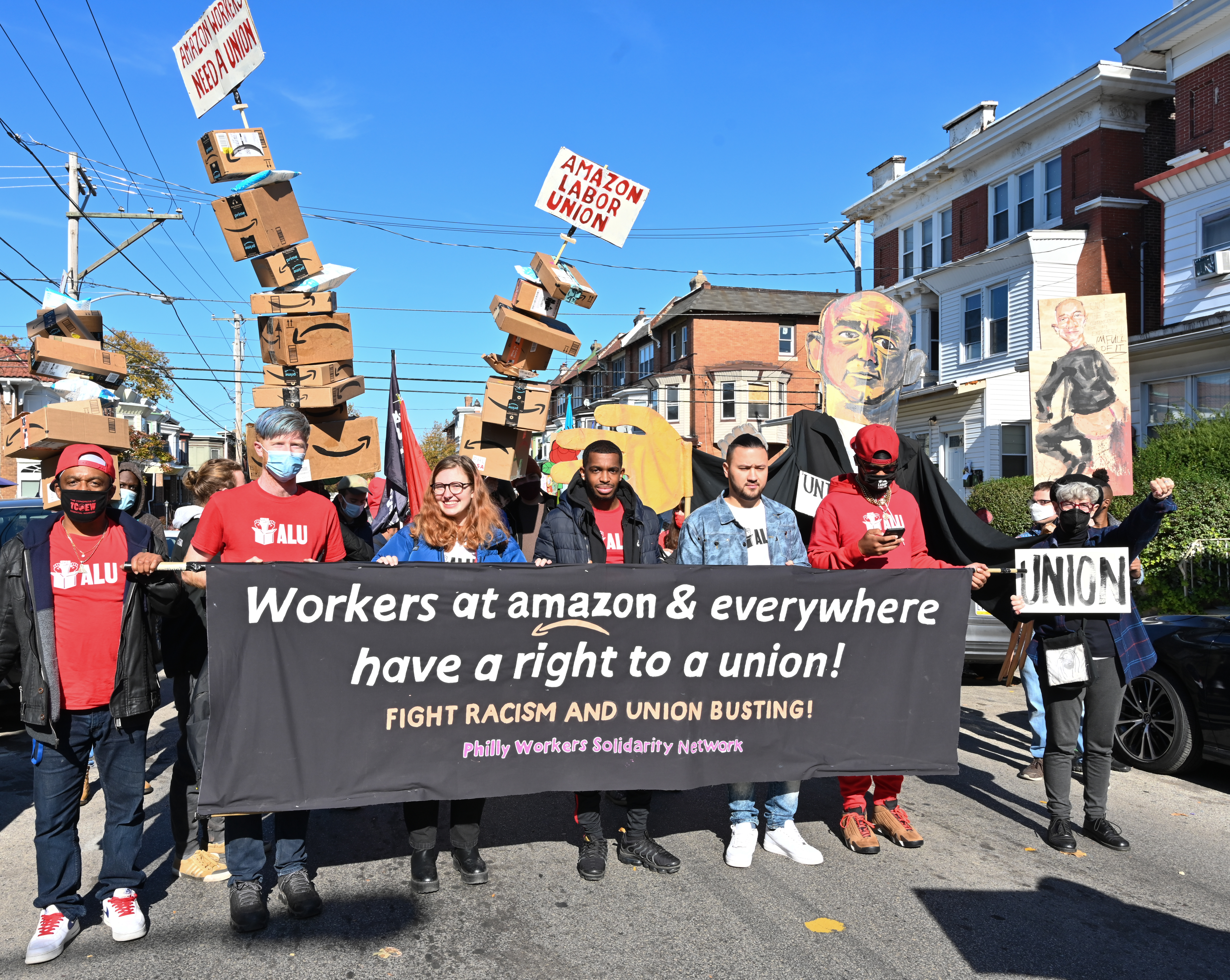
An Organize Amazon Workers contingent in the Peoplehood Parade in Philadelphia

Amazon has opposed efforts by trade unions to organize in the United States and the United Kingdom.

In 2001, 850 employees in Seattle were laid off by Amazon after a unionization drive. The Washington Alliance of Technology Workers (WashTech) accused the company of violating labor law, saying that Amazon managers subjected it to intimidation and propaganda. Amazon denied any link between the unionization effort and the layoffs. That year, Amazon.co.uk hired The Burke Group (a US management consultant) to help in defeating a campaign by the Graphical, Paper and Media Union (GPMU, now part of Unite the Union) to achieve recognition at the Milton Keynes distribution depot. It was alleged that the company victimized or sacked four union members during the 2001 recognition drive and held a series of captive meetings with employees.

In July 2015, the International Association of Machinists and Aerospace Workers union filed a complaint with the National Labor Relations Board (NLRB) against Amazon, alleging that the company engaged in unfair labor practices by surveilling, threatening, and “informing employees that it would be futile to vote for union representation” during a union drive in 2014 and 2015 at an Amazon warehouse in Chester, Virginia. In 2016, Amazon settled the complaint with the NLRB, denying any wrongdoing but agreeing to post a list at the warehouse of 22 forms of union-busting behavior that the company promised not to engage in, including threatening workers with the loss of a job or other reprisals if they were union supporters, interrogating workers about the union, or engaging in surveillance of workers while they participated in union activities.

In 2018, Amazon distributed a 45-minute union-busting training video to managers at Whole Foods, which it had acquired in 2017, which said, "We are not anti-union, but we are not neutral either. We do not believe unions are in the best interest of our customers or shareholders or most importantly, our associates." The video encouraged the reporting of "warning signs" of worker organization which included workers using terms such as "living wage", employees "suddenly hanging out together," and workers showing "unusual interest in policies, benefits, employee lists, or other company information."

In early 2020, Amazon internal documents were leaked which said that Whole Foods was using a heat map to track which of its 510 stores had the highest levels of pro-union sentiment. Factors including racial diversity, proximity to other unions, poverty levels in the surrounding community, and calls to the NLRB were named as contributors to "unionization risk." Data collected on the heat map suggested that stores with low racial and ethnic diversity, especially those in poor communities, were more likely to unionize. Amazon had a job listing for an intelligence analyst to identify and tackle threats to Amazon, including unions.

On 4 December 2020, the NLRB found that Amazon had illegally fired two employees in retaliation for efforts to organize workers.

In April 2021, after most workers in Bessemer, Alabama voted against joining the Retail, Wholesale and Department Store Union, the union asked for a hearing with the NLRB to determine whether the company created "an atmosphere of confusion, coercion and/or fear of reprisals" before the union vote. The vote had been met with "anti-union" signs and mandatory "union education meetings", according to Amazon employee Jennifer Bates. During the vote, President Joe Biden made a speech acknowledging the organizing workers in Alabama and called for "no anti-union propaganda". This was followed by an increase in activity by public-relations staff on Twitter, reportedly at the direction of Jeff Bezos. The tone of some posts led one Amazon engineer to initially suspect that the accounts had been hacked. Some of the criticism of unions came from generic, recently-created accounts rather than known Amazon personalities. One account, which was quickly banned, attempted to use the likeness of YouTuber Tyler Toney from Dude Perfect.

In April 2021, The Intercept reported on a planned internal Amazon messaging app which would ban terms such as "union", "living wage", "freedom", "pay raise" or "restrooms".

In April 2022, Amazon workers in Staten Island voted to form Amazon Labor Union, the company's first legally-recognized union. In August of that year, workers in Albany, New York filed a petition for an election in an attempt to become the fourth unionized warehouse at the time.

In May 2024, workers at an Amazon warehouse in St. Peters, Missouri filed an unfair labor practice charge against the company with the NLRB, accusing the company of using "intrusive algorithms" as part of a surveillance program to deter union organizing at the warehouse.

In June 2024, a group of 104 delivery drivers at Amazon's DIL7 facility in Skokie, Illinois, employed by contractor Four Star Express Delivery as part of Amazon's Delivery Service Partner subcontractor program, and organized with the Teamsters Local 704 union, filed unfair labor practice charges with the NLRB against both Amazon and Four Star Express as a single or joint employer, alleging that their employer terminated employees for organizing a union, surveilled workers attempting to organize, implemented a hiring freeze in response to unionization efforts, suppressed pro-union speech on employee message boards, altered terms of employment in response to union activity, and sought to permanently close the DIL7 facility in response to union organizing.

=== Wages ===
During the summer of 2018, Vermont Senator Bernie Sanders criticized Amazon's wages and working conditions in a series of YouTube videos and media appearances. Sanders noted that Amazon had paid no federal income tax the previous year, and solicited stories from Amazon warehouse workers who felt exploited by the company. A story by James Bloodworth described the environment as akin to "a low-security prison", saying that company culture used Orwellian newspeak. Reports cited a finding by New Food Economy that one-third of fulfillment-center workers in Arizona were on the Supplemental Nutrition Assistance Program (SNAP). Responses by Amazon included incentives for employees to tweet positive stories and a statement which called the salary figures used by Sanders "inaccurate and misleading". According to the statement, it was inappropriate of Sanders to refer to SNAP as "food stamps". Sanders and Ro Khanna introduced the Stop Bad Employers by Zeroing Out Subsidies (Stop BEZOS) Act on September 5, 2018, aimed at Amazon and other reported beneficiaries of corporate welfare such as Walmart, McDonald's and Uber. Among the bill's supporters were Tucker Carlson of Fox News and Matt Taibbi, who criticized himself and other journalists for not covering Amazon's contribution to wealth inequality earlier. On October 2, 2018, Amazon announced that its minimum wage for all American employees would be raised to $15 per hour; Sanders congratulated the company for the decision.

In 2023, over 350 workers at Amazon's Coventry warehouse in the United Kingdom walked off the job for a pay raise from £10.50 to £15 an hour. Amazon offered a 50p-per-hour increase, which was rejected by GMB.

=== Working conditions ===
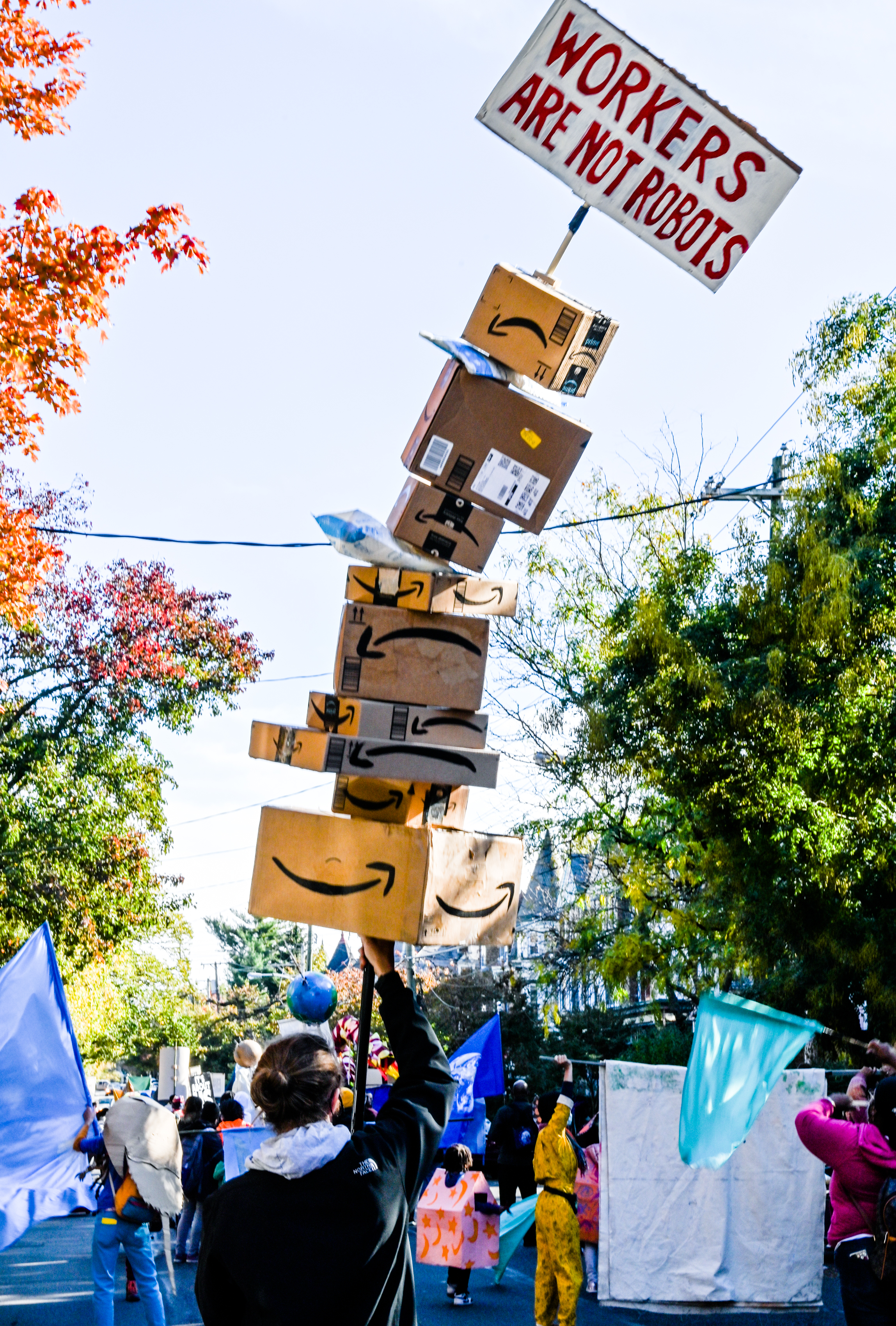
Organize Amazon Workers contingent in the Peoplehood Parade in Philadelphia, Pennsylvania

Former employees, current employees, the media, and politicians have criticized Amazon for poor working conditions. In 2011, it was publicized that workers had to perform tasks in 100 °F (38 °C) heat at the Breinigsville, Pennsylvania warehouse. Workers became dehydrated and collapsed, but loading-bay doors were not opened to allow in fresh air because of concerns about theft. Amazon's initial response was to pay for an ambulance to wait outside on call for overheated employees, but the company eventually installed air conditioning in the warehouse.

Some workers ("pickers") who travel the building with a trolley and a handheld scanner "picking" customer orders can walk up to 15 miles (24 km) during a workday; if they fall behind on their quotas, they can be reprimanded. The handheld scanner informs an employee in real time about how quickly they are working, and allow team leaders and area managers to track employee location and idle time. The work has been described as dehumanizing and robotic.

For a February 2013 German television report, journalists Diana Löbl and Peter Onneken conducted a covert investigation at an Amazon distribution center in Bad Hersfeld, Hessen. The report highlighted the behavior of some security guards, employed by a third-party company, who had a neo-Nazi background or dressed in neo-Nazi apparel and intimidated foreign and temporary female workers. The third-party security company involved was delisted by Amazon shortly after the report.

In March 2015, it was reported in The Verge that Amazon would remove 18-month non-compete clauses from its US employment contracts for hourly workers after criticism that it unreasonably prevented such employees from finding other work. Short-term temporary workers must sign an agreement prohibiting them from working at any company where they would "directly or indirectly" support any good or service which competes with Amazon, even if they are fired or laid off. A front-page article in The New York Times profiled several former Amazon employees who described a "bruising" workplace culture in which sick workers or those with personal crises were pushed out or unfairly evaluated. Bezos responded with a Sunday memo to employees disputing the Times account of "shockingly callous management practices" which he said would never be tolerated at the company. To boost employee morale, Amazon announced on November 2, 2015, that it would extend its paid leave for new mothers and fathers. The change, for birth and adoptive parents, could be used in conjunction with existing maternity leave and medical leave for new mothers.

In mid-2018, investigations by journalists and media such as The Guardian reported poor working conditions at Amazon's fulfillment centers. In response to criticism that Amazon does not pay its workers a living wage, Jeff Bezos announced that effective November 1, 2018, all US and UK Amazon employees would have a $15-per-hour minimum wage. Amazon would also lobby for a $15-per-hour federal minimum wage. The company also eliminated stock awards and bonuses for hourly employees. A September 11, 2018, article exposed poor working conditions for Amazon's delivery drivers, describing missing wages, lack of overtime pay, favoritism, intimidation, and time constraints which forced drivers to speed and skip meals and bathroom breaks. Amazon uses Netradyne artificial intelligence cameras in some partner vans to monitor safety incidents and driver behavior, which some drivers have criticized. On Black Friday in 2018, Amazon warehouse workers in several European countries (including Italy, Germany, Spain, and the United Kingdom) went on strike to protest inhumane working conditions and low pay.

The Daily Beast reported in March 2019 that emergency services responded to 189 calls from 46 Amazon warehouses in 17 states between 2013 and 2018 relating to suicidal employees. Workers attributed their mental breakdowns to employer-imposed social isolation, aggressive surveillance, and hurried and dangerous working conditions at the warehouses. One former employee said, "It's this isolating colony of hell where people having breakdowns is a regular occurrence."

On July 15, 2019, during Amazon's Prime Day, employees in the United States and Germany went on strike to protest unfair wages and poor working conditions. In August 2019, the BBC reported on Amazon's Twitter ambassadors. Their support for, and defense of, Amazon and its practices have led Twitter users to suspect that they are bots used to dismiss issues affecting Amazon workers. A flurry of new ambassador accounts claiming to be employees defended the company against a March 2021 unionization drive, in some cases falsely claiming that opting out of union dues was impossible. Amazon confirmed that at least one was fake, and Twitter shut down several for violating its terms of use. In November 2019, NBC reported that some contracted Amazon locations, against company policy, allowed people to make deliveries using the badges and passwords of others to circumvent employee background checks and avoid financial penalties (or termination) for sub-standard performance. Amazon's performance quotas were criticized as unrealistic, pressuring drivers to speed, run stop signs, carry overloaded vehicles, and urinate in bottles due to lack of time for bathroom stops; the company generally avoided legal liability for vehicle crashes by using independent contractors.

During the COVID-19 pandemic in March 2020, when the government instructed companies to restrict social contact, Amazon's UK staff was forced to work overtime to meet demand spiked by the disease. A GMB spokesperson said that the company had put "profit before safety". GMB has continued to raise concerns about "grueling conditions, unrealistic productivity targets, surveillance, bogus self-employment and a refusal to recognise or engage with unions unless forced", calling for the UK government and safety regulators to address these issues. In its 2020 statement to US shareholders, Amazon said: "We respect and support the Core Conventions of the International Labour Organization (ILO), the ILO Declaration on Fundamental Principles and Rights at Work, and the United Nations Universal Declaration of Human Rights". Observance of the global human-rights principles has been "long held at Amazon and codifying them demonstrates our support for fundamental human rights and the dignity of workers everywhere we operate". Subcontracted delivery drivers in Canada brought a class-action lawsuit against Amazon Canada in June 2020, saying that $200 million in unpaid wages were owed to them because Amazon retained "effective control" over their work and should legally be considered their employer. On November 27, 2020, Amnesty International said that Amazon workers had faced great health and safety risks since the start of the COVID-19 pandemic. On Black Friday, one of Amazon's busiest periods, the company failed to ensure key safety features in France, Poland, the United Kingdom, and the United States. Workers risked their health and lives to ensure that essential goods were delivered to consumers, helping Amazon achieve record profits.

Amazon said on January 6, 2021, that it planned to build 20,000 affordable houses, spending $2 billion in regions with major facilities. On January 24, 2021, Amazon said that it planned to open a pop-up clinic in partnership with Virginia Mason Franciscan Health in Seattle to vaccinate 2,000 people against COVID-19 on the clinic's first day. The following month, Amazon said that it planned to put cameras in its delivery vehicles. Although many drivers were upset by this decision, the company said that videos would only be sent under certain circumstances. Drivers have said that they sometimes have to urinate and defecate in their vans as a result of pressure to meet quotas. This was denied in a tweet from the official Amazon News account: "You don't really believe the peeing in bottles thing, do you? If that were true, nobody would work for us." Amazon employees then leaked an email to The Intercept indicating that the company was aware that its drivers were doing so: "This evening, an associate discovered human feces in an Amazon bag that was returned to station by a driver. This is the 3rd occasion in the last 2 months when bags have been returned to the station with poop inside." Amazon acknowledged the issue after denying it.

A June 2021 analysis of Occupational Safety and Health Administration data by The Washington Post found that Amazon warehouse jobs "can be more dangerous than at comparable warehouses." The following month, workers at the New York City warehouse filed a complaint with OSHA describing harsh, 12-hour workdays with sweltering internal temperatures which resulted in fainting workers carried out on stretchers: "Internal temperature is too hot. We have no ventilation, dusty, dirty fans that spread debris into our lungs and eyes, are working at a non-stop pace and [we] are fainting out from heat exhaustion, getting nose bleeds from high blood pressure, and feeling dizzy and nauseous." Many fans provided by the company reportedly did not work, water fountains were often dry, and cooling systems were insufficient. The filers were affiliated with the Amazon Labor Union which was attempting to unionize the warehouse despite company opposition. Similar conditions have been reported elsewhere, such as in Kent, Washington during the 2021 heat wave.

A 2021 report by the National Employment Law Project found that working conditions at Amazon fulfillment centers in Minnesota were dangerous and unsustainable, with more than double the rate of injuries compared to non-Amazon warehouses from 2018 to 2020. In December 2021, after a tornado destroyed an Amazon warehouse in Illinois, the company and its policies were criticized for forcing people to continue working despite the imminent arrival of the tornado; a cellphone ban preventing access to emergency alerts, and company founder Jeff Bezos' apparent insensitivity to the catastrophe as he celebrated his space company's latest achievement and only belatedly acknowledged the loss of life.

In July 2022, a worker in a fulfillment center in Cartaret, New Jersey died due to heat stress, while working through the busy Prime Day week. The temperature outside was recorded at 92 F. Workers across multiple US fulfillment centers have claimed (often by sneaking in thermometers to prove their claims) that indoors temperatures are much higher. Amazon claimed that the worker's death was not related to the heat, however they installed air conditioning a few weeks after the incident.

In March 2022, the Washington state labor department fined Amazon $60,000 for willfully violating workplace safety laws by requiring workers at an Amazon warehouse in Kent, Washington to perform repetitive motions at a fast pace, leading to an increased risk of injury.

In December 2022, OSHA fined Amazon $29,008 for injury record-keeping violations. The agency fined Amazon $60,269 the following month for unsafe conditions in three warehouses, including falling boxes and un-ergonomic and exhausting lifting requirements which resulted in serious lower-back injuries. The fines were low compared to the company's profits, but were the maximum allowed for general duty clause violations of the Occupational Safety and Health Act. In June 2023, Bernie Sanders began a Senate investigation into "dangerous and illegal" working conditions at Amazon's fulfillment centers.

In February 2024, California Occupational Safety and Health Administration fined Amazon $14,625 for not giving air freight workers adequate shade and water on very hot summer days in 2023.

In June 2024, the California Labor Commissioner’s Office fined Amazon $5.9 million, after an investigation of two warehouses east of Los Angeles revealed 59,017 violations of California's 2022 Warehouse Quotas law, which requires employers to disclose productivity quotas to employees and prohibits employers from requiring warehouse workers to meet unsafe quotas.

=== 2018 strike ===
Spanish unions called on 1,000 Amazon workers to strike from July 10 through Amazon Prime Day, with calls for the strike to be seen worldwide and for customers to follow suit. A Comisiones Obreras (CCOO) union representative said that complaints were based on wage cuts, working conditions, and restrictions on time off. Amazon workers in Poland, Germany, Italy, England, and France have also voiced grievances.

=== Stop BEZOS Act ===
On September 5, 2018, Senator Bernie Sanders and Representative Ro Khanna introduced the Stop Bad Employers by Zeroing Out Subsidies (Stop BEZOS) Act, aimed at Amazon and other alleged beneficiaries of corporate welfare such as Walmart, McDonald's, and Uber. This followed several media appearances in which Sanders underscored the need for legislation to ensure that Amazon workers received a living wage. Reports cited a finding by New Food Economy that one third of Amazon warehouse workers in Arizona were on the Supplemental Nutrition Assistance Program (SNAP). Amazon initially released a statement which called this "inaccurate and misleading", but an October 2 announcement affirmed that its minimum wage for all employees would be raised to $15 per hour.

=== Racial discrimination ===
Current and former Amazon corporate workers, including former diversity lead Chanin Kelly-Rae, went public in 2021 about alleged systemic discrimination against women and people of color. That year, a number of Black employees filed discrimination lawsuits against the company. Additionally, working conditions at Amazon warehouses globally, disproportionately affect racialized women from the Global South. As a form of so-called redemptive labour, they are exploited and underpaid as the alternative forms of labour they could choose to undertake are construed as immoral and often are systematically made unavailable, effectively preventing professional mobility.

=== Response to the COVID-19 pandemic ===
An Amazon warehouse protest on March 30, 2020, in Staten Island led to the firing of its organizer, Chris Smalls. Amazon defended the decision by saying that Smalls was supposed to be in self-isolation at the time, and leading the protest put its other workers at risk. Smalls called the response "ridiculous". New York State attorney general Letitia James was considering legal reaction to the firing, which she called "immoral and inhumane", and asked the National Labor Relations Board to investigate. Smalls accused the company of retaliating against him for organizing a protest. At the Staten Island warehouse, one case of COVID-19 was confirmed by Amazon; workers believed that there were more and said that the company had not cleaned the building, given them suitable protection, or informed them of potential cases. Smalls said that many workers were in risk categories, and the protest demanded that the building be sanitized and the employees paid during that process. Derrick Palmer, another worker at the Staten Island facility, told The Verge that Amazon quickly communicates through text and email when they need staff to work mandatory overtime but waited days to tell employees when a colleague contracted the disease. Amazon said that the Staten Island protest only attracted 15 of the facility's 5,000 workers, but other sources reported much larger crowds. On April 14, 2020, two Amazon employees were fired for "repeatedly violating internal policies" after they circulated an internal petition about health risks for warehouse workers. During the COVID-19 pandemic, Amazon introduced $2-per-hour hazard pay of, changes to overtime pay and unlimited, unpaid time off until April 30, 2020. Hazard pay expired in June 2020 and the paid-time-off policy in May 2022. Amazon introduced temporary restrictions on the sale of non-essential goods, and hired 100,000 more staff in the US and Canada. Some Amazon workers in the US, France, and Italy protested the company's decision to "run normal shifts" despite many COVID-19 infections. In Spain, the company faced legal complaints over its policies. A group of US Senators wrote an open letter to Bezos in March 2020 expressing concerns about worker safety. On May 4, Amazon vice president Tim Bray resigned "in dismay" over the firing of whistleblowers who spoke out about the lack of COVID-19 protections, including shortages of face masks and the company's failure to implement promised temperature checks. Bray called the firings "chickenshit" and said they were "designed to create a climate of fear" in Amazon warehouses. In a Q1 2020 financial report, Jeff Bezos announced that Amazon expected to spend $4 billion or more (predicted operating profit for Q2) on COVID-19 issues: personal protective equipment, higher wages for hourly teams, cleaning of facilities, and expanding Amazon's COVID-19 testing capabilities. From the beginning of 2020 until September of that year, Amazon said that 19,816 employees had contracted COVID-19.

==== Closure in France ====
France's SUD trade unions brought a court case against Amazon for unsafe working conditions. On April 15, 2020, the district court in Nanterre ordered the company to limit its deliveries to essential items (including electronics, food, medical or hygienic products, and supplies for home improvement, animals, and offices) or face a fine of €1 million per day. Amazon immediately closed its six warehouses in France, continuing to pay workers but limiting deliveries to items shipped from third-party sellers and warehouses outside France. The company said that the €100,000 fine for each prohibited item shipped could result in billions of dollars in fines, even with a fraction of items misclassified. After losing an appeal and reaching an agreement with labor unions for higher pay and staggered work schedules, the company reopened its French warehouses on May 19 of that year.

=== Employee dissent ===
In 2014, former Amazon employee Kivin Varghese threatened to begin a hunger strike to protest Amazon's unfair policies. In November 2016, an Amazon employee jumped from the roof of the company's headquarters office due to unfair treatment at work. Amazon Web Services vice-president Tim Bray resigned in 2020 in protest of the company's treatment of employees who publicly agitated against unhealthy working conditions in Amazon warehouses during the COVID-19 pandemic. In April 2022, The Intercept reported that Amazon's planned internal messaging app would ban words (such as "union", "living wage", "freedom", "pay raise" and "restrooms") which might indicate worker unhappiness.

=== Forced labor in China ===
According to a report by the Australian Strategic Policy Institute, a think tank partially funded by the US Department of Defense, Amazon is a company "potentially directly or indirectly benefiting" from forced Uyghur labor.

== Treatment of customers ==
=== Differential pricing ===
In September 2000, price discrimination potentially violating the Robinson–Patman Act was found on amazon.com. Amazon offered to sell a buyer a DVD for one price, but after the buyer deleted cookies which identified him as a regular Amazon customer he was offered the same DVD for a substantially lower price. Jeff Bezos apologized for the differential pricing and said that Amazon "never will test prices based on customer demographics". The company said that the difference was the result of a random price test and offered to refund customers who paid higher prices. Amazon had experimented with random price tests in 2000, when customers comparing prices on a bargain-hunter website discovered that Amazon randomly offered the Diamond Rio MP3 player for substantially less than its regular price.

=== Product substitution ===
The British consumer organization Which? published information about Amazon Marketplace in the UK which indicates that when small electrical products are sold on the marketplace, the delivered product may not be the same as the product advertised. A test purchase was described in which eleven orders were placed with different suppliers via a single listing. Only one of the suppliers delivered the actual product displayed; two others delivered different, functionally-equivalent products, and eight suppliers delivered products which were quite different and incapable of safely performing the advertised function. The Which? article described how customer reviews of a product were actually a mix of reviews for all the different products, with no way to identify which product came from which supplier. The issue was raised in evidence to the UK Parliament in connection with a new consumer-rights bill.

=== Items added to baby registries ===
In 2018, it was reported that Amazon contained sponsored ads pretending to be items on a baby registry. The ads looked similar to actual items on the registry.

=== WikiLeaks ===
On December 1, 2010, Amazon stopped hosting the website associated with WikiLeaks; the company did not initially say whether it forced the site to leave. According to The New York Times, "Senator Joseph I. Lieberman, an independent of Connecticut, said Amazon had stopped hosting the WikiLeaks site on Wednesday after being contacted by the staff of the Homeland Security and Governmental Affairs Committee".

In a later press release, Amazon said that the reason was "a violation of [Amazon's] terms of service", because Wikileaks.org was "securing and storing large quantities of data that isn't rightfully theirs, and publishing this data without ensuring it won't injure others." Assange said that WikiLeaks chose Amazon knowing it would probably be kicked off the service "in order to separate rhetoric from reality" and to show that the jurisdiction "suffered a free speech deficit".

Amazon's action led to an open letter from Daniel Ellsberg, who wrote that he was "disgusted by Amazon's cowardice and servility", likening it to "China's control of information and deterrence of whistleblowing", and called for a "broad" and "immediate" boycott of Amazon.

=== User privacy ===
The Amazon Echo sparked concern about the company releasing customer data at the behest of government authorities. According to Amazon, voice recordings of customer interactions with the assistant are stored with the possibility of release in response to a warrant or subpoena. Police requested such data during their investigation of the November 22, 2015, death of Victor Collins at the home of James Andrew Bates in Bentonville, Arkansas. Amazon refused to comply at first, but Bates later consented.

Although Amazon has publicly opposed government surveillance, according to Freedom of Information Act requests it has supplied facial-recognition support to law enforcement in the forms of Amazon Rekognition technology and consulting services. Initial testing included Orlando, Florida, and Washington County, Oregon. Amazon offered to connect Washington County with other Amazon government customers interested in Rekognition and a body-camera manufacturer. The ventures are opposed by a coalition of civil-rights groups, who are concerned that they could lead expanded surveillance and abuse; it could automate the identification and tracking of anyone, particularly in the context of potential police body-camera integration. Due to a backlash, the city of Orlando said that it would no longer use the technology but might reconsider at a later date.

A February 17, 2020, BBC Panorama documentary highlighted the amount of data collected by Amazon and its move into surveillance, concerning for politicians and regulators in the US and Europe. On July 16, 2021, the Luxembourg National Commission for Data Protection fined Amazon Europe Core SARL (Note: European Amazon Headquarters, a subsidiary of Amazon Inc., is based in Luxembourg.) a record €746 million ($888 million) for processing personal data in violation of the EU General Data Protection Regulation (GDPR). The fine, about 4.2 percent of Amazon's reported $21.3 billion 2020 income, and was the largest ever imposed for a violation of the GDPR. Amazon announced that it would appeal the decision.

In June 2023, Amazon agreed to pay the US Federal Trade Commission (FTC) $25 million for violating children's privacy with its Amazon Alexa. The company was accused of keeping Alexa recordings for years and using them illegally to develop algorithms, despite assuring users that it had deleted the recordings.

In September 2024, the FTC released a report summarizing 9 company responses (including from Amazon) to orders made by the agency pursuant to Section 6(b) of the Federal Trade Commission Act of 1914 to provide information about user and non-user data collection (including of children and teenagers) and data use by the companies that found that the companies' user and non-user data practices put individuals vulnerable to identity theft, stalking, unlawful discrimination, emotional distress and mental health issues, social stigma, and reputational harm.

== Customer reviews ==
As customer reviews have become integral to Amazon marketing, reviews have been challenged on accuracy and ethical grounds. In 2004, The New York Times reported that a glitch in the Amazon Canada website revealed that a number of book reviews had been written by authors of their own books or of competing books. Amazon changed its policy of allowing anonymous reviews to one which gave an online credential to reviewers registered with Amazon, although it still allowed them to remain anonymous with pen names. In April 2010, British historian Orlando Figes was found to have posted negative reviews of other authors' books. Two months later, a Cincinnati news blog uncovered a group of 75 Amazon book reviews which had been written and posted by a public-relations company on behalf of its clients. A Cornell University study that year said that 85 percent of Amazon's high-status consumer reviewers "had received free products from publishers, agents, authors and manufacturers." By June 2011, Amazon had moved into the publishing business and begun to solicit positive reviews from established authors in exchange for increased promotion of their books and upcoming projects.

Amazon.com's customer reviews are monitored for indecency, but permit negative comments. Robert Spector, author of the book amazon.com, wrote: "When publishers and authors asked Bezos why amazon.com would publish negative reviews, he defended the practice by claiming that amazon.com was 'taking a different approach ... we want to make every book available – the good, the bad, and the ugly ... to let truth loose'" (Spector 132). Amazon allegedly deleted negative reviews of Scientology-related items, despite the reviews' compliance with comments guidelines.

In November 2012, it was reported that Amazon.co.uk deleted "a wave of reviews by authors of their fellow writers' books in what is believed to be a response to [a] 'sock puppet' scandal." After the listing of Untouchable: The Strange Life and Tragic Death of Michael Jackson, a disparaging biography of Michael Jackson by Randall Sullivan, his fans were organized on social media as "Michael Jackson's Rapid Response Team to Media Attacks" and bombarded Amazon with negative reviews and negative ratings of positive reviews.

Amazon removed a large number of one-star reviews from the listing of former presidential candidate Hillary Clinton's book, What Happened, in 2017. In 2018 and 2020, it was reported that Amazon had allowed sellers to bait-and-switch; after reviewers had praised a product, it would be replaced by a different product while retaining the positive reviews.

In 2022, researchers at UCLA found that millions of products purchase fake positive reviews in private Facebook groups. They indicated the widespread use of fake positive reviews by a variety of products, which substantially increase sales. Amazon said that in 2019, the company spent over $500 million and employed more than 8,000 people to stop fake reviews. In July and August 2022, it sued the administrators of 10,000 Facebook groups which coordinate fake product reviews and several companies involved in faking seller feedback and bypassing sales bans.

=== Goodreads ===
Goodreads has had a number of scandals concerning its book-review system, including a practice known as "review-bombing", which is a form of trolling and extortion used to decrease or inflate an author's book ratings. Reasons for this practice include cancel culture, financial gain, bullying and harassment, defamation and self-promotion. Both traditionally-published authors and self-published authors are targeted. Rin Chupeco, a popular fantasy novelist, has raised concerns that Goodreads leaves moderation primarily in the hands of volunteers with editing privileges and authors marginalized by race, gender, ethnicity and sexual orientation are often targets. Unlike Amazon, Goodreads does not verify if users own (or have access to) books they claim to have read and does not moderate sockpuppetry, trolling or fake accounts. Goodreads imposed new rules restricting reviews which criticize author behavior, such as those that mock an author's political affiliation or religion. Goodreads staff are responsible for moderating such content, and some malicious content remains publicly posted until the affected party takes legal action.

=== IMDb ===
IMDb (the Internet Movie Database), like Goodreads, does not verify user access to or viewership of media. According to the website, "IMDb ratings are 'accurate' in the sense that they are calculated using a consistent, unbiased formula, but we don't claim that IMDb ratings are 'accurate' in an absolute qualitative sense. We offer these ratings as a simplified way to see what other IMDb users all over the world think about titles listed on our site." IMDb's ratings system has been questioned. Alyssa Bereznak wrote for The Ringer in 2019, "Last week, HBO’s Chernobyl shot to the top of IMDb’s all-time TV rankings, outperforming other mega-popular hits like Breaking Bad, Game of Thrones, and various stoner-friendly seasons of Planet Earth. And as of Tuesday, it had a 9.6-star (out of 10) average rating from more than 200,000 users on the Amazon-owned entertainment site. To the knee-jerk press, the limited series’ ascension was evidence of a historic hit. The Economist ran with the numbers, comparing them to traffic spikes on the "Chernobyl nuclear disaster" Wikipedia page, declaring the show 'the highest-rated TV series ever', and marveling at the reach of its subject matter." Bereznak said that the ratings were primarily by white male users, noting earlier trolling scandals where media with largely female, racialized casts and crew were ranked lower in a form of review manipulation (particularly if the content was political). The debate about whether IMDb's reviews are coming from a mostly-white-male demographic arose again when review manipulation was allegedly used to lower the ratings of Black Panther, which had a mostly-black cast and a racial storyline.

Kate Erbland wrote for IndieWire that the film-aggregation site Rotten Tomatoes experienced the same type of trolling as IMDb for the 2018 Disney film A Wrinkle in Time, which had an ethnically-diverse cast (including Oprah Winfrey). According to Erbland, "there's no foolproof way to verify that anyone offering up an audience review or rating have actually seen it, and everyone knows it. Gaming the system is so easy that it can be weaponized against films and creators by something as lo-fi as a Facebook group, and that problem will likely only become a more sophisticated one as other groups dedicated to bringing down scores attempt to maneuver around roadblocks." Like Goodreads, IMDb has experienced review-bombing; the website halted reviews of the 2022 animated film Lightyear, which includes a same-sex couple briefly kissing.

== Other questionable business practices ==
=== Tax avoidance ===
Amazon's taxes were investigated in China, Germany, Poland, South Korea, France, Japan, Ireland, Singapore, Luxembourg, Italy, Spain, United Kingdom, the United States, and Portugal. A report released by Fair Tax Mark in 2019 called the company the "worst" offender for tax avoidance, paying a 12-percent effective tax rate between 2010 and 2018 (in contrast with a 35-percent corporate tax rate in the US during the same period). According to Amazon, it had a 24-percent effective tax rate during that period. The Fair Tax Foundation released a follow up report in 2025, and this again listed Amazon as 'the worst'.

=== HQ2 bidding war ===
The announcement of Amazon's plan to build HQ2 (a second headquarters) was met with 238 proposed locations, 20 of which became finalist cities on January 18, 2018. In November of that year, the company was criticized for narrowing this down to "the two richest cities": Long Island City (in New York City) and Arlington, Virginia, in the Washington metropolitan area. Critics, including business professor Scott Galloway, called the bidding war "a con" and a pretext for gaining tax breaks and inside information for the company.

Congresswoman Alexandria Ocasio-Cortez opposed the $1.5 billion in tax subsidies given to Amazon as part of the deal. Ocasio-Cortez said that restoring the city's subway system would be a better use for the money, despite a statement by New York governor Andrew Cuomo that the state would benefit economically. Politico then reported that 1,500 affordable homes had been planned for the land occupied by Amazon's new office. The request by Amazon executives for a helipad at each location was controversial, with a number of New York City Council members calling the proposal frivolous.

=== Rigged contests ===
In October 2024, Amazon India was accused of rigging giveaway contests in favour of an individual named Chirag Gupta since 2014.

== Relationship with governments ==
=== Potential conflicts of interest ===
In 2013, Amazon secured a US$600 million contract with the CIA which has been described as a potential conflict of interest involving the Bezos-owned Washington Post and his newspaper's coverage of the CIA. This was followed by a bid for a US$10 billion contract with the Department of Defense. Although critics initially considered the government's preference for Amazon a foregone conclusion, the defense contract was signed with Microsoft.

=== Censorship ===
Amazon has ceded to the censorship demands of several countries. In 2021, the company's Chinese website complied with an order from the Chinese government to remove customer reviews and ratings for a book about Chinese Communist Party general secretary Xi Jinping's speeches and writings. The book's comments section was also disabled. In 2022, Amazon yielded to a UAE government demand and restricted LGBTQ products on its Emirati website. Documents indicated that, threatened with unknown penalties, Amazon removed searches for over 150 keywords related to LGBTQ products. A number of books were also blocked, including My Lesbian Experience With Loneliness by Nagata Kabi, Gender Queer: A Memoir by Maia Kobabe, and Bad Feminist by Roxane Gay.

=== Project Nimbus ===
Project Nimbus is a $1.2 billion agreement in which Amazon and Google will provide Israel and its military with artificial intelligence, machine learning, and other cloud-computing services, including local cloud sites which will "keep information within Israel's borders under strict security guidelines." The contract has been criticized by shareholders and employees concerned that the project may lead to abuses of Palestinian human rights in the Israeli–Palestinian conflict. Concerns have been voiced about how the technology will facilitate the surveillance of Palestinians, unlawful data collection, and the expansion of Israeli settlements.

In June 2025, Francesca Albanese's report for the United Nations on corporations complicit in the Gaza genocide named Amazon as one of several companies "central to Israel's surveillance apparatus and the ongoing Gaza destruction."

=== NHS healthcare data ===
The UK government has given Amazon access to healthcare information published by the National Health Service. The data will be used by Amazon's Alexa to answer medical questions, although Alexa also uses other sources of information. The material, which excludes patient data, could also allow the company to sell its products. The contract allows Amazon access to information on symptoms, causes, and definitions of conditions and "all related copyrightable content and data and other materials". Amazon can then create "new products, applications, cloud-based services and/or distributed software", from which the NHS will not financially benefit and which can be shared with third parties. The government said that allowing Alexa devices to offer health advice to users will reduce pressure on doctors and pharmacists.

=== Seattle head tax ===
In May 2018, Amazon threatened the Seattle City Council about an employee head-tax proposal which would have funded houselessness services and low-income housing. The tax would have cost Amazon about $800 per employee, or 0.7 percent of their average salary. In response, Amazon paused construction on a new building, threatened to limit further investment in the city, and funded a repeal campaign. The measure, which originally passed, was repealed after a costly campaign spearheaded by Amazon.

=== Tennessee expansion ===
Incentives from the Metropolitan Council of Nashville and Davidson County to Amazon for the company's new Operations Center of Excellence in Nashville Yards (owned by Southwest Value Partners) have been controversial, including a decision by the Tennessee Department of Economic and Community Development to keep the full extent of the agreement secret. Incentives include "$102 million in combined grants and tax credits for a scaled-down Amazon office building" and "a $65 million cash grant for capital expenditures" in exchange for the creation of 5,000 jobs over a seven-year period.

The Tennessee Coalition for Open Government called for more transparency. The People's Alliance for Transit, Housing, and Employment (PATHE), another local organization, suggested that no public money should be given to Amazon; instead, it should be spent on building more public housing for the working poor and the homeless and investing in more public transportation for city residents. Others suggested that incentives to large corporations do not improve the local economy.

The proposal to give Amazon $15 million in incentives was criticized by the Nashville Firefighters Union and the Nashville chapter of the Fraternal Order of Police in November 2018, who called it "corporate welfare." In February 2019, another $15.2 million in infrastructure was approved by the council. It was opposed by three council members, including Angie Henderson (who called it "cronyism").

=== USPS agreement ===
In early 2018, US president Donald Trump repeatedly criticized Amazon's use of the United States Postal Service for the delivery of packages. "I am right about Amazon costing the United States Post Office massive amounts of money for being their Delivery Boy," Trump tweeted. "Amazon should pay these costs (plus) and not have them bourne [sic] by the American Taxpayer." Amazon stock shares fell by six percent as a result of Trump's comments. Shepard Smith of Fox News disputed Trump's claims, citing evidence that the USPS was offering below-market prices to all customers and no advantage to Amazon.

== Partnerships and associations ==
=== Hikvision ===
Amazon has worked with the Chinese technology company Hikvision. According to The Nation, "The United States has considered sanctioning Hikvision, which has provided thousands of cameras that monitor mosques, schools, and concentration camps in Xinjiang."

=== Palantir hosting ===
Amazon provides cloud web hosting services via Amazon Web Services (AWS) to Palantir, a data-analysis company which has developed software used to gather data on undocumented immigrants and hosted on Amazon's AWS cloud. In June 2018, Amazon employees signed a letter demanding that the company drop Palantir from AWS. According to Forbes, Palantir "has come under scrutiny because its software has been used by ICE agents to identify and start deportation proceedings against undocumented migrants."

On July 7, 2019, Make the Road New York and local leaders connected with Jews for Racial and Economic Justice led a protest by over 1,000 people in response to Amazon's financial ties to Palantir and its $150 million in contracts with the U.S. Immigration Customs Enforcement Agency (ICE). The protest shut down Amazon's midtown-Manhattan location of Amazon Books and was held on Tisha B'Av, the Jewish day of mourning and fasting which commemorates the destruction of ancient temples in Jerusalem.

=== Influence on local news ===
In late May 2020, before its May 27 shareholders' meeting, at least eleven local news stations aired identically-worded segments which spoke positively about Amazon's response to the coronavirus pandemic. Zach Rael, an anchor for the Oklahoma City station KOCO-TV, posted that Amazon had tried to send him the same prepared package. Senator and Amazon critic Bernie Sanders condemned the coverage, calling it propaganda. Most of the provided video was narrated by Amazon public-relations manager Todd Walker. Of the eleven identified channels, WTVG in Toledo, Ohio was the only one that attributed the statements to Walker.

== Other legal action ==
=== Trademark issues ===
In 1999, the Amazon Bookstore Cooperative in Minneapolis, Minnesota sued amazon.com for trademark infringement. The cooperative had been using the name "Amazon" since 1970, and reached an out-of-court agreement to share the name with the online retailer.

In 2014, UK courts ruled that Amazon had infringed the trademark of Lush soap. Lush (the soap manufacturer) had not made its products available on Amazon, but the company advertised alternative products via Google searches for "Lush soap".

=== Alleged libel ===
In September 2009, Amazon was selling MP3 music downloads falsely suggesting that a well-known Premier League football manager was a sex offender. Despite a campaign urging the retailer to withdraw the item, Amazon cited freedom of speech. The company eventually decided to withdraw the item from its UK website when legal action was threatened.

=== Alleged release of personal details ===
In October 2011, actress Junie Hoang filed a $1 million lawsuit against Amazon in Washington's Western District Court for allegedly revealing her age on Amazon subsidiary IMDb with details from her credit card. The lawsuit, which alleged fraud, breach of contract and violation of her private life and consumer rights, said that after joining IMDbPro in 2008 to increase her chances of getting roles, Hoang said that her date of birth had been added to her public profile; she is older than she looks, and received less acting work and earnings. According to Hoang, IMDb refused her request to remove the information in question. All claims against Amazon, and most claims against IMDb, were dismissed by Judge Marsha J. Pechman; the jury found for IMDb on the sole remaining claim. In March 2015, Hoang lost on appeal.

=== IMDb deadnaming ===
After Nova Scotian actor Elliot Page and American actress Laverne Cox came out as transgender in 2020, IMDb changed its legal policy about proper names on actor biographies; exceptions were made for people who had changed their names, so their birth name would not appear on IMDb profiles. The change was made after an outcry from LGBTQ+ support groups and organizations; GLAAD director of transgender representation Nick Adams told The New York Times, "To reveal a transgender person’s birth name without their explicit permission is an invasion of privacy that only serves to undermine the trans person's true authentic identity, and can put them at risk for discrimination, even violence." GLAAD agreed to support a SAG-AFTRA legal challenge which sought to restrict the personal information that IMDb can publish.

== Environmental impact ==
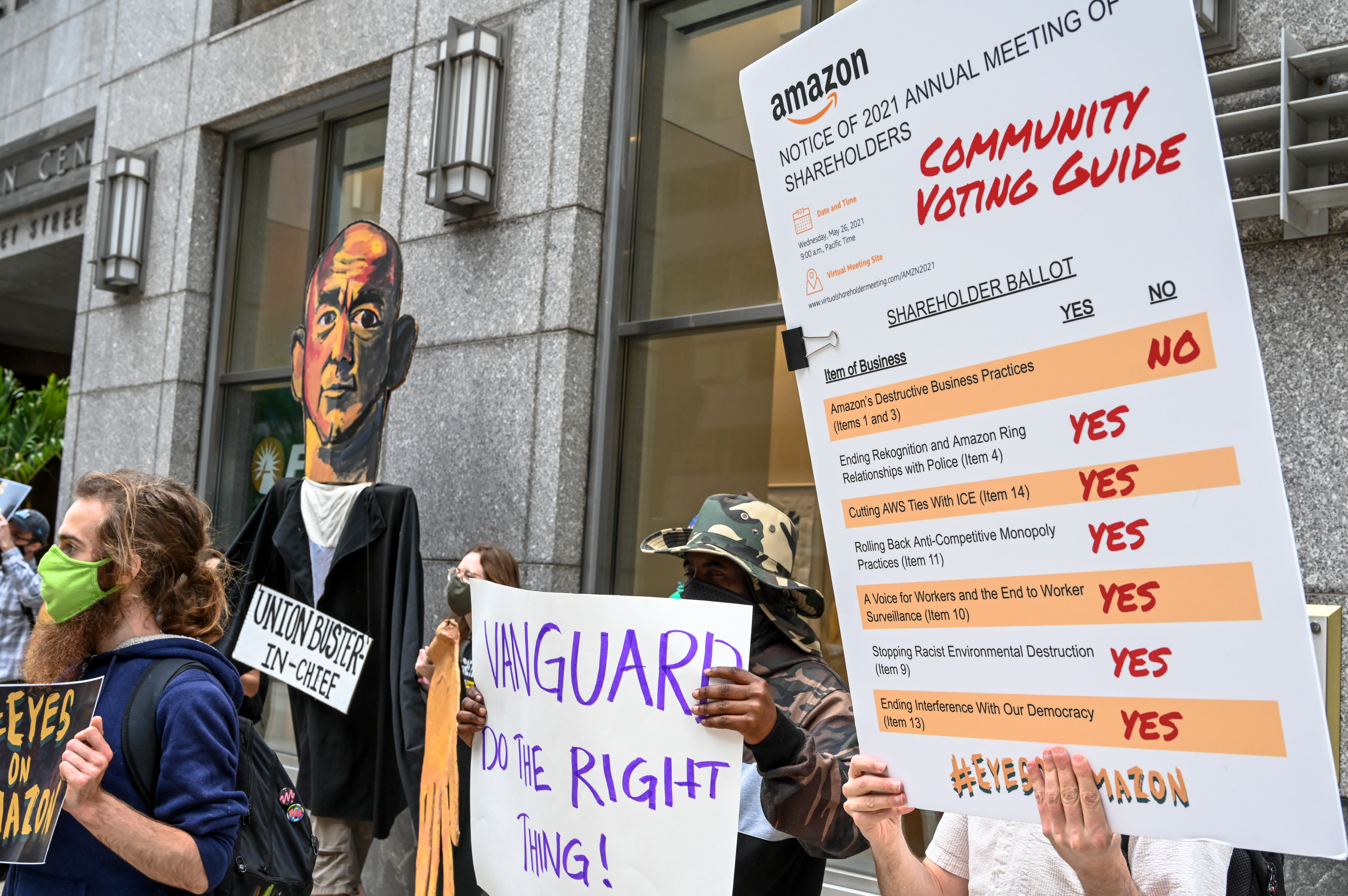
Eyes on Amazon Shareholders day of action in Boston in May 2021

Amazon has been criticized for its negative impact on the environment. Critics have accused it of skirting environmental laws and of greenwashing. Amazon is the founding member of The Climate Pledge, a commitment to reach net-zero carbon emissions by 2040 for Amazon and other signatories to the pledge. However, critics have claimed that the Climate Pledge amounts to little more than corporate PR due to the disconnect between the stated goals and the actions taken by the company. A number of Amazon's environmental actions and commitments, including the Climate Pledge, has come after sustained activism by employees and outsiders.

Amazon has been accused of illegal retaliation against employees engaging in climate activism. On one occasion, the National Labor Relations Board found merit in an unfair labor practices suit. Amazon settled with the plaintiffs out of court.

The company's large scale, a heavy reliance on fossil fuels and plastic, and their anti-environmental lobbying practices contribute to the criticism. The company has repeatedly failed to disclose their emissions data in the past and currently discloses a subset of emissions data in a format that isn't aligned with reporting standards.

=== Lobbying against environmental protection laws ===
Amazon has been criticized for their lobbying practices. Amazon has supported lobbying groups like the US Chamber of Commerce and the Business Roundtable, who have pushed back on environmental protection clauses in the Democrat-led Build Back Better bill.

Amazon has lobbied for increased subsidies for Green Hydrogen, by silently backing the trade group Fuel Cell & Hydrogen Energy Association (FCHEA). Critics have raised numerous problems with Green Hydrogen, the primary one being that it requires a large amount of energy to produce and would merely move the emissions source from the vehicles themselves to the electrical grid. Amazon's lobbying has taken place despite its own studies finding that 95% of the world's green hydrogen is generated primarily in grids based on fossil fuels.

Amazon has a large number of data centers in Oregon and has been criticized for overwhelming the supply of renewable energy in the state, requiring it to import dirty energy from outside the state. In 2023, Amazon lobbied against environmental protection legislation (bill HB2816) in Oregon, which sought to ensure new data centers would run completely on renewable energy by 2040. Critics say that the bill was unsuccessful primarily due to Amazon's sustained lobbying efforts. Representative Pam Marsh, a co-sponsor of the bill, said "From the very first moment we started talking about this bill, Amazon started organizing against it."

Amazon co-founded the Emissions First Partnership, which aims to lobby against strong Renewable Energy Certificates (RECs) regulations. They advocate for being able to use RECs independent of geographical origin, which would allow them to claim that their facilities are being powered by green energy, when in fact they would have just bought space in a foreign grid, disconnected from that of the US.

=== Fossil fuel emissions ===
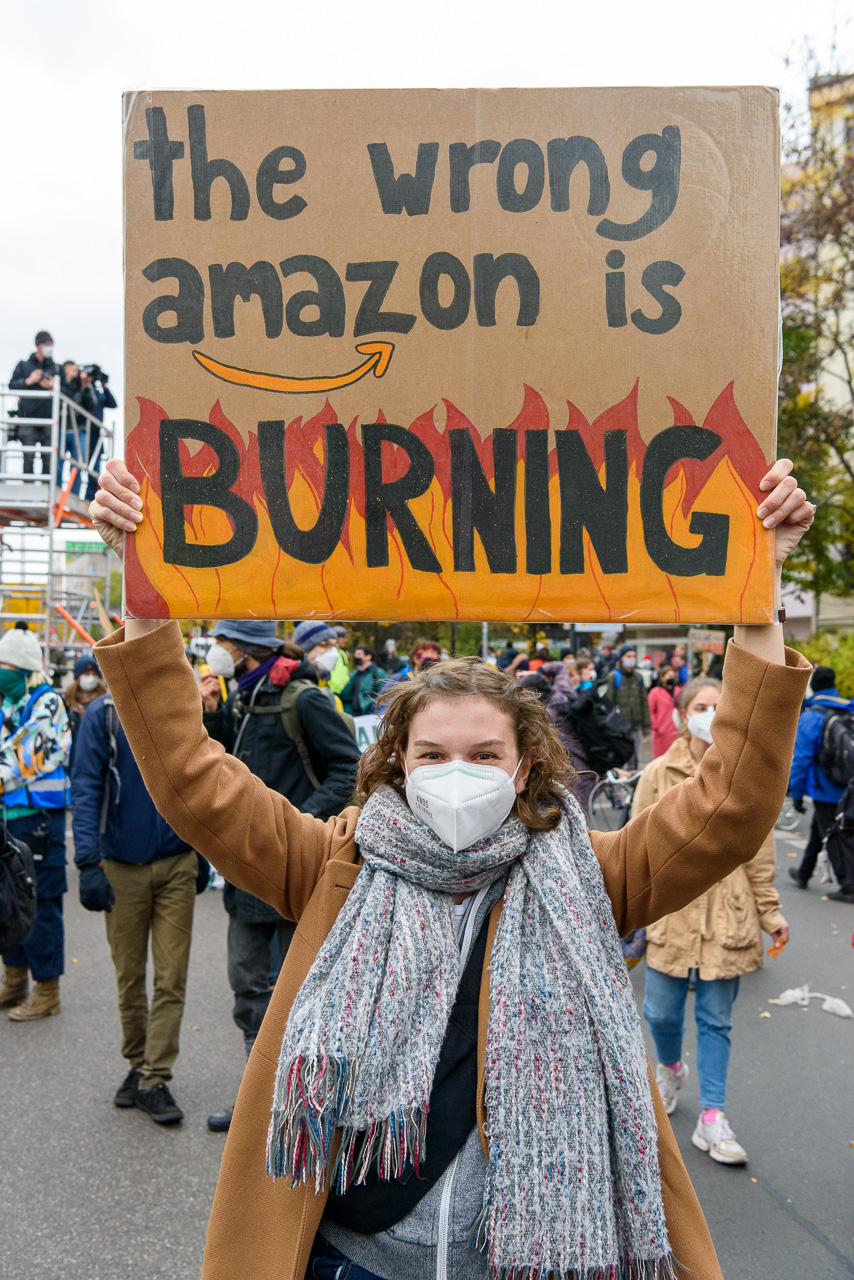
A protestor with a sign reading "The wrong Amazon is burning", referring to the Amazon rainforest wildfires and Amazon's negative impact on the environment

Amazon has consistently attained a rating of F by the Carbon Disclosure Project (CDP). Amazon has been pressured in the past by some of its employees, via shareholder resolutions, to disclose emissions, but has rejected all proposals.

Amazon has been criticized for selective reporting of emissions, not aligned with reporting standards. Amazon only reports on the emissions from private brand products, which make up an estimated 1% of its total sales.

=== Destruction of unsold and returned products ===
An investigation by ITV in 2021 found that Amazon was destroying 130,000 items of unsold stock a week at one of the company's fulfillment centers in Scotland. The investigation uncovered a leaked document which had 124,000 items marked "destroy" and 28,000 items marked "donate". Amazon denied these claims. Amazon has faced similar accusations in Germany and France, with the countries enacting new laws to make it more difficult for Amazon to continue such practices.

=== Role in exporting plastic waste to be burnt in India ===
An investigation by Bloomberg in December 2022 revealed that plastic waste intended for recycling in the US was ending up in India, where it was being burnt. The investigation did not single out Amazon but noted that the most ubiquitous packaging in the garbage heaps was by Amazon. The report said that Amazon produced its packaging with soft plastic, which was the most difficult and least economically viable to recycle, while still displaying the recyclable logo on the products. Amazon declined to comment on the report.

=== Sale of climate change denial books ===
Amazon has sold climate change denial books that have been criticized as disinformation.

=== Sale of illegal pesticides ===
Amazon has been prosecuted by the Environmental Protection Agency (EPA) for their role, between 2013 and 2016, in importing, warehousing, packaging, shipping, and profiting from pesticides and insecticides that are illegal in the US. In 2018, Amazon entered a settlement with the EPA and agreed to pay $1.2 million in penalties.

=== PFAS in packaging ===
Amazon faced a class-action lawsuit in 2020 over their use of Per- and polyfluoroalkyl substances (PFAS), colloquially known as "forever chemicals", in its Amazon Kitchen brand product, including disposable plates and bowls. The lawsuit claimed that Amazon marked the products as compostable when PFAS are not considered compostable. The lawsuit was dropped and Amazon made a policy update to not use PFAS in their Amazon Kitchen branded products.

=== Delivery fleet ===
Amazon has been criticized for an over-reliance on fossil-fuel powered vehicles in its delivery fleet.

=== Traffic congestion ===
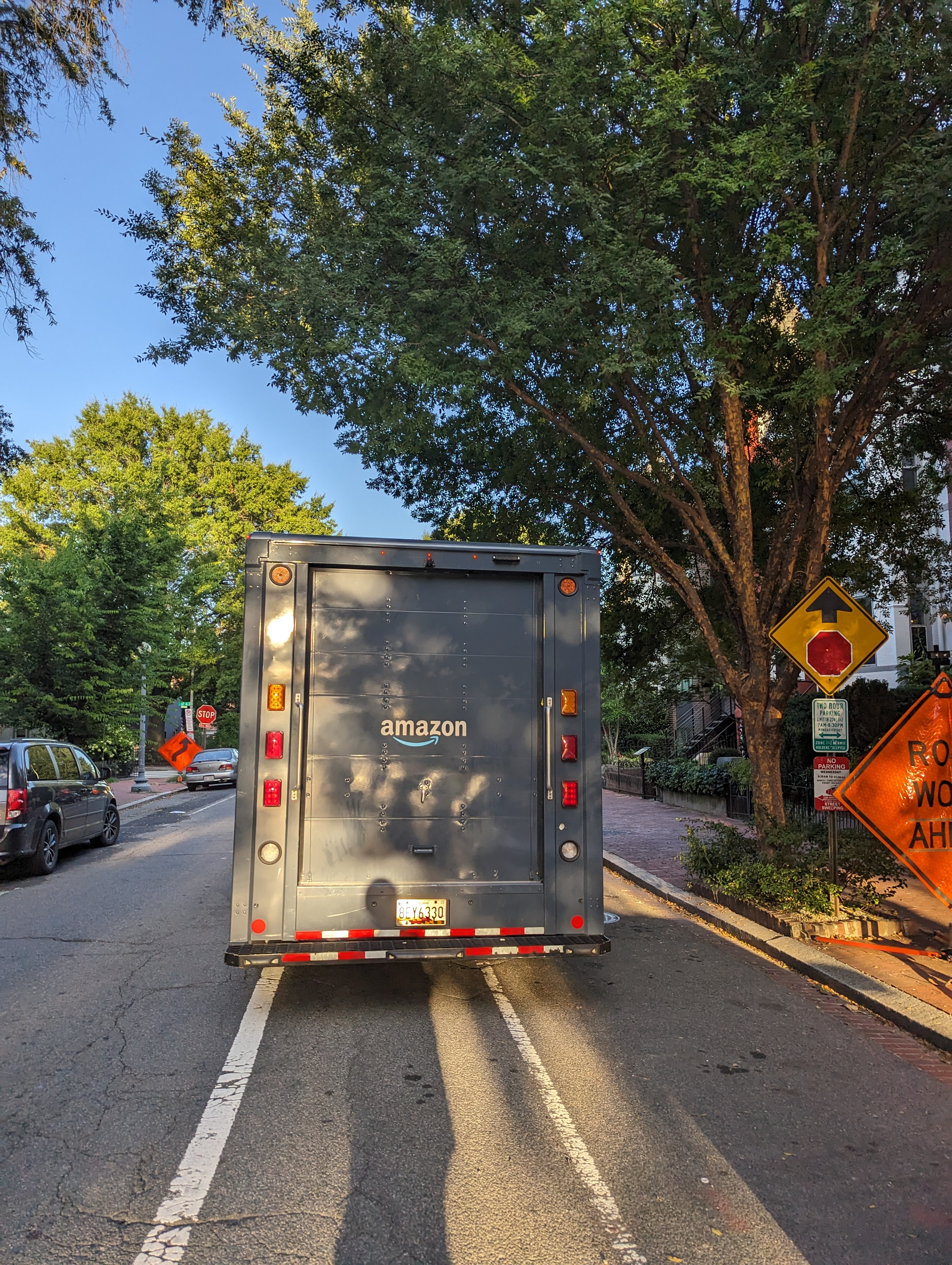
An Amazon Prime truck illegally blocking a bike lane in Washington, D.C.

Amazon Prime has been criticized for its vehicles systemically double parking, blocking bike lanes, and otherwise violating traffic laws while dropping off packages, contributing to traffic congestion and endangering other road users.

== In popular culture ==
=== Books ===
One of the first books critical of Amazon was a Canadian collection of essays, Against Amazon: Seven Arguments. The book was originally hand-bound and printed in a limited run by author Jorge Carrión before it was picked up by the independent Canadian publisher Biblioasis, when it sold well and began appearing in university bookstores. Another such book was How to Resist Amazon and Why by Danny Caine, published by Raven Books and widely distributed in North America. The book referred to Amazon as "Scamazon" (a portmanteau of "Amazon" and "scam"), and contained information about shopping locally and avoiding Amazon.

=== Advertising ===
The Virginia-based Alliance for Main Street Fairness ran a number of television ads in 2011 with an anti-Amazon theme, encouraging customers to shop responsibly. This was partly due to a proposed bill which would have forced Amazon to be pay more taxes.

Canadian resident Ali Haberstroh became frustrated with the number of brick-and-mortar business closures in the country in 2020 and created an advertising website called Not Amazon, which promotes businesses and corporations not affiliated with Amazon. The Guardian published an article about the website that year, by which time Not Amazon had received 350,000 visitors. Amazon had no comment about the article.

=== Video game ===
The 2018 browser game You Are Jeff Bezos satirized the extent of Jeff Bezos' wealth, with the player cast as Bezos and tasked with spending his net worth.

== Other criticisms ==
In March 2026, the Federal Communications Commission dismissed Amazon's criticism of SpaceX, citing that they should focus on internal operations rather than "worrying about other people".
