= Ifeoma Ozoma =

American public policy specialist and technology industry equity advocate

- Born: 1991 or 1992 (age 33–34)
- Education: Yale University
- Occupations: Public policy and tech equity consultant
- Known for: Workers' rights advocacy in the technology industry

Ifeoma Ozoma (born 1991 or 1992) is an American public policy specialist and technology industry equity advocate. After two years working on public policy at Pinterest, Ozoma resigned and spoke out about mistreatment and racial discrimination she alleged she had experienced at the company. She subsequently began a consulting firm called Earthseed, and has worked to advocate for whistleblower protection legislation and other worker protections in the technology industry. She is the director of tech accountability at the University of California, LA Center on Race and Digital Justice.

She has been recognized by The Root and Time for her work.

Ozoma is followed in the film My NDA along with two other people exposing how non-disclosure agreements in employment contracts are weaponized. Her work on the Silenced No More Act in California is also in the film.

== Early life and education ==
Ozoma grew up in Anchorage, Alaska, and Raleigh, North Carolina. Her parents are Nigerian immigrants. Ozoma attended high school at Choate Rosemary Hall, a private college-preparatory boarding school in Connecticut. She earned a Bachelor of Arts in political science from Yale University in 2015.

== Career and advocacy ==
After graduating college, Ozoma joined Google at the Washington, D.C., office in 2015, where she worked on public policy and was a government liaison. She then spent two years at Facebook in Silicon Valley, working on international relations.

=== Pinterest ===
Ozoma joined Pinterest's newly-formed public policy and impact team in 2018. While she was at Pinterest, she orchestrated its widely-praised decision to stop promoting former slave plantations as wedding venues. She also worked on subjects including medical misinformation, and helped Pinterest implement a policy to ban anti-vaccination content from its platform.

While at Pinterest, she spent a year advocating for a pay raise, which she said would have brought her compensation in line with that of colleagues with similar experience and responsibilities. She ultimately hired a lawyer to assist her with negotiations about her title and compensation. After Ozoma suggested that the company add a content warning to posts by Ben Shapiro, a conservative political commentator whom she described as a "white supremacist", a colleague collaborated with a right-wing group to dox Ozoma by publishing her personal phone number, name, and photographs on extremist websites. Ozoma began to receive death threats. Pinterest did not help Ozoma get the information removed, nor punished the employee who was responsible.

Already frustrated with what she described as a "dangerously inadequate" response to the doxing incident, and with fruitlessly advocating for a raise, a manager's criticism in a performance review of the language she had used in the wedding venue policy was the last straw for her. In May 2020, Ozoma resigned from her position and filed a complaint with California Department of Fair Employment and Housing (DFEH). She eventually reached a settlement with Pinterest.

Ozoma began publicly discussing her experiences in June, breaking a non-disclosure agreement, after Pinterest declared what she believed to be empty support of Black lives in the wake of the George Floyd protests and Black Lives Matter advocacy around the country. Along with colleague Aerica Shimizu Banks, who also resigned and filed a complaint with DFEH, she publicly stated she had been paid unfairly at Pinterest, and faced retaliation when calling for change. Both women criticized the environment as hostile and discriminatory toward Black women. In August, Pinterest employees staged a walkout to protest the company's mistreatment of women, particularly women of color.

Ozoma and Banks each received less than a year of severance pay when they quit. A few months later, Françoise Brougher, Pinterest's former chief operating officer, was awarded a $22.5 million settlement in a gender discrimination lawsuit against the company. Others in the tech industry, including Timnit Gebru, criticized Pinterest for what they saw as racist disparity in how the company treated Ozoma and Banks, and how they treated Brougher, who is white. According to The Guardian, Ozoma and Banks had "laid the groundwork" for others at the company, including Brougher, to speak out about discrimination. Ozoma described the settlement as a "slap in the face".

In November 2021, Pinterest settled a shareholder lawsuit filed by the Employees' Retirement System of Rhode Island that alleged executives enabled a toxic culture of discrimination. The lawsuit was based on the allegations made by Ozoma and Banks. The settlement earmarked $50 million into diversity, equity, and inclusion efforts at the company.

After resigning from Pinterest, Ozoma founded Earthseed, a consulting firm focused on equity in the tech industry.

=== Silenced No More Act ===
Ozoma co-sponsored (Note: Although sponsors of proposed legislation normally are legislators, in California, outside parties lobbying for legislation are referred to as "sponsors".) California's Silenced No More Act, legislation that protects employees who speak about harassment and discrimination even if they've signed a non-disclosure agreement. The bill was authored by Ozoma and Senator Connie Leyva, and was passed by the California State Assembly. It was signed into law by Governor Gavin Newsom in October 2021, and went into effect on January 1, 2022.

In fall 2021, Ozoma inspired Chelsey Glasson, a former Google employee who sued for pregnancy discrimination, and worked with Cher Scarlett, a former Apple software engineer and labor activist who had been a leader of the #AppleToo movement, to bring a similar bill to Washington state, which was passed into law in March 2022. Google and Apple committed to Silenced No More protections for all employees.

=== Apple shareholder proposal ===
In September 2021, Ozoma, non-profit shareholder advocacy group Open MIC, and social impact investing firms Whistle Capital and Nia Impact Capital filed a shareholder proposal at Apple. The group asked the company to perform a risk assessment with respect to non-disclosure clauses imposed on employees who have experienced harassment or discrimination. The proposal came following a less formal suggestion from Ozoma and Nia, to proactively add a statement to employment agreements saying that employees were not prevented from "discussing or disclosing information about unlawful acts in the workplace, such as harassment or discrimination". Apple refused, saying this was already reflected in its Business Conduct Policy.

On October 18, 2021, Apple filed a no-action response to the shareholder proposal with the U.S. Securities and Exchange Commission (SEC), claiming that Apple does not utilize the types of concealment clauses that Nia was referencing.

On November 22, 2021, Nia filed a response to Apple and the SEC, stating that they had "received information, confidentially provided, that Apple has sought to use concealment clauses in the context of discrimination, harassment, and other workplace labor violation claims". Scarlett later revealed she had provided Nia with the information. On December 21, 2021, the SEC ruled against Apple's filing, a win for the activists. Eight United States treasurers called on the SEC to investigate. Shareholders voted in favor of the proposal of the audit on March 4, 2022. Apple published the results of the audit in December 2022 and committed to non-enforcement of provisions found that might limit "a person’s ability to speak about [unlawful] conduct".

=== The Tech Worker Handbook ===
In collaboration with organizations such as Omidyar Network, The Signals Network, and Lioness, Ozoma launched The Tech Worker Handbook in October 2021. It is a website containing free resources for tech workers who are looking to make more informed decisions about whether to speak out on issues that are in the public interest. The handbook guides workers through what they might encounter in the legal process, how to approach the media, and information on how to navigate physical and security concerns. This includes anecdotes and recommendations from other tech whistleblowers.

== Recognition ==
Ozoma was included in The Root's 2021 "The Root 100", an annual list of the most influential African Americans in various fields.

Ozoma was recognized by Time in 2022 in the Time 100 Next list and was honored as one of the BBC 100 Women in the same year.

== Personal life ==
Ozoma resides in Santa Fe, New Mexico.

== See also ==
- Timnit Gebru
- Sophie Zhang
- Claire Stapleton
- Chanin Kelly-Rae
