= Chanin Kelly-Rae =

American diversity and inclusion practitioner

- Occupations: Diversity, Equity and Inclusion Subject Matter Expert and Practitioner
- Years active: 20+ Years
- Known for: Whistleblowing at Amazon, DEI Expert, Strategist, Policy Writer, Educator, Public Speaker, and Executive

Chanin Kelly-Rae (born 1970) is an American diversity and inclusion practitioner. She is the founder and chief executive officer of Chanin Kelly-Rae Consulting, a diversity management firm.

She served briefly as the global director of diversity in the Amazon Web Services division of Amazon, and resigned to expose what she alleged to be "deep, systemic issues" disadvantaging underrepresented workers, especially those that are Black.

== Early life and education ==
Kelly-Rae attended Rufus King International High School in Milwaukee, Wisconsin, where she grew up with her father, Gus Kelly, who was a chef, mother and five siblings. She has a Bachelor of Arts degree in English and cultural studies from the University of Wisconsin–Milwaukee and a graduate certificate in diversity management from Cornell University.

== Career ==
Kelly-Rae started her career as a middle school and high school teacher in Milwaukee.

Kelly-Rae then went on to serve as the senior director of inclusion and equity for the National Court Appointed Special Advocate Association, the diversity manager for Catholic Community Services of Western Washington, and as the statewide diversity manager for Washington State.

In 2019, Kelly-Rae joined Amazon as the global director of diversity of Amazon Web Services. In February 2021, she went public about her resignation 10 months into her career at Amazon as part of a Recode investigation that uncovered a practice at Amazon to rate its Black employees more harshly than their white peers in performance reviews, and as a result are promoted less frequently. In January 2020, she said that she was dismissed by Beth Galetti at the company's first annual diversity summit when she offered to share why access to data was imperative for diversity and inclusion work because she hadn't worked at the company for long enough. Galetti had said at the summit that the employees don't "need the data to do [the] job".

Kelly-Rae described Amazon's culture as having a culture of fear around speaking out about workplace issues. She was the first worker to come forward on the record, and has since helped others speak out, including Charlotte Newman, who has since filed a lawsuit against Amazon alleging discrimination and sexual harassment. Kelly-Rae has also said that her resignation followed the company's philanthropic Black Lives Matter response, which she said did not align with the corporate culture.

Kelly-Rae also alleged that after joining, she noticed a pattern of "de-leveling" of women in which roles advertised at a certain level, at which the women applicants were qualified, would be extended offers at a lower level. She alleged she was also "de-leveled", which she said was confirmed by two vice president and the hiring manager. She also said that she was given a tight budget that her peers told her didn't even amount to their budgets for organization swag like t-shirts and said the company under-used its affirmative action hiring plan.

She further alleged that her time at Amazon showed the company's reluctance to "devote serious attention" to creating and maintaining a diverse workforce, and that the company's release of data hid disaggregated data to make it look like their corporate workforce was more diverse than what she witnessed. Kelly-Rae said that the 26% of Black workers Amazon shared in its diversity statistics were misleading, as the majority of Black workers at Amazon work in the warehouses and "the only Black people that [she] saw [in Amazon’s Seattle headquarters] every day were either opening doors or cleaning floors." On Fox News, Kelly-Rae pointed out the issues with company responses which try to downplay employee unrest involving diversity with numbers, referring to large workforces compared to small percentages of outspoken workers. She said that companies don't recognize that the share of employees speaking out about workplace issues is representative of those affected by those issues.

Amazon has said that they "work hard to make Amazon a company where our Black employees and people of all backgrounds feel included, respected, and want to grow their careers" and that they "do not tolerate discrimination or harassment in any form." They also said it is a common practice for the company to "de-level" all employees, indiscriminate of their identity.

After leaving Amazon in September 2020, she founded Chanin Kelly-Rae Consulting, a diversity management firm.

== Personal life ==
Kelly-Rae said she relocated to Seattle to avoid racial issues in Milwaukee. In 2004, the Seattle Post-Intelligencer named her "coach of the year" for boys' tennis after her third year coaching boys tennis at Lakeside School.

As of February 2019, Kelly-Rae resided in Everett, Washington with her husband Richard Rae and two children.

== See also ==
- Ifeoma Ozoma
- Sophie Zhang
- Frances Haugen
- Chelsey Glasson
