= Chelsey Glasson =

American user researcher

- Born: 1982 or 1983 (age 43–44)
- Education: University of Washington (BA, MS); University of Denver (CA); Cornell University (CA); William S. Boyd School of Law
- Occupation: User researcher
- Known for: Workers' rights advocacy
- Spouse: Maxwell Glasson (m. 2006)
- Website: blackboxthebook.com

Chelsey Glasson (born 1982 or 1983) is an American user researcher, author, and workers' rights advocate. She sued Google, her former employer, for pregnancy discrimination, which ended in an undisclosed settlement after two years of litigation. She has successfully lobbied for pregnancy anti-discrimination and labor rights laws in Washington State. Her memoir, Black Box: A Pregnancy Discrimination Memoir, was published in 2023. She left tech to pursue a law career in 2024.

== Education and early life ==
Glasson was born in Ogallala, Nebraska. She comes from a large Family farm on father's side. Her mother is a social worker. Her family moved to Everett, Washington, when she was young near her mother's family and her father's job at Boeing. After the move, her parents divorced. Her mother spent part of her childhood in foster care and attempted to overdose on anxiety medication when Glasson was in the third grade. Glasson says was subjected to corporal punishment in the home by her father growing up, which led her to self-harm and an eating disorder.

Glasson's mother remarried when she was in the 4th grade, and she moved with her mother and step-father to Snohomish, Washington. She graduated from Snohomish High School in 2001. She took piano lessons, played in the school's jazz band, and says she was academically high-achieving. She won the title of Miss Snohomish County in 2003, qualifying her as a Miss Washington contestant. She made her platform about eating disorder awareness advocacy. Senator Harry Reid entered testimony Glasson gave on the topic into the Congressional Record in 2006.

She met her husband, Maxwell, while they were both taking summer courses at the University of Washington (UW). At the time, she was studying geography and international communication. She later moved with Maxwell to Zephyr Cove, Nevada, where he was from near South Lake Tahoe, California.

Glasson holds a Bachelor of Arts from UW in Communications. Glasson earned a Master of Science in Human Centered Design and Engineering (HCDE) from UW in 2011. She holds certificates from Cornell University and University of Denver.

Glasson enrolled in law school in 2024 at Gonzaga University School of Law. As of October 2025, she is a student at the William S. Boyd School of Law in Las Vegas.

== Career ==
Glasson started her career in politics. She was an intern for Maria Cantwell, a United States Senator, and worked as a public policy analyst for the Nevada Legislature. During a project she was leading at that time, she was tasked with designing a promotional website, prompting her to enroll in graduate school to change careers. She said she realized she was enrolled in the wrong program halfway through earning a Master of Arts in Communication when she took a user experience design (UX) course, which led her to enroll in the HCDE graduate program at UW and transition into the field of UX. Glasson also said that she was inspired by a woman in executive leadership at Microsoft to find a tech career.

=== 2010–2014 ===
In 2010, while in graduate school, Glasson worked as an intern at T-Mobile, where she was later promoted to a full-time employee and laid off a few months later. After receiving her master's degree, Glasson worked at Salesforce.

She later joined Udacity as their lead user experience researcher, where she said she hoped to help democratize education. While at Udacity, Glasson developed a course under the direction of then-vice president of product and design Irene Au, "Intro to the Design of Everyday Things", which was based on the first two chapters of Don Norman's book, The Design of Everyday Things, revised and expanded in 2013. The instructors of the asynchronous course were Glasson, Norman and design professor Kristian Simsarian. Glasson also implemented the reflective exercises.

Glasson became a guest editor for UX Magazine in 2013.

=== Google (2014–2019) ===
Glasson joined Google in Mountain View, California, in 2014 as a user researcher, and was promoted several times into management. She said she was a strong performer, twice receiving a "superb" rating through the company's performance cycles. In July 2016, while Glasson was on her first of two maternity leaves, she relocated to Seattle, Washington, to work out of Google's Kirkland and Seattle offices. She said her manager, who was influential in the company's research department, allowed her to work remotely for the first few weeks after her leave ended. She said that this was due to her being a top performer. She was eventually promoted to managing a team of six, with another promotion planned prior to her second pregnancy. She left the company in August 2019 following what she alleged to be retaliation for reporting and experiencing pregnancy discrimination. Glasson did note that the company did not lay her off; however, they told her that she could not receive a promotion until she came back from maternity leave, and later, when she began to have more difficulties in her pregnancy, she was then informed that there may not be a management role for her upon her return to Google.

In early August 2019, Glasson posted a 2,300-word memo about her departure from Google on an internal message board, which went viral within the company and was reported upon outside of the company, gaining media attention. In the memo she described her nearly five years at Google, and how her treatment at the company changed drastically after she reported what she alleged to be inappropriate comments about one of her direct reports, a mother of two sets of twins, in the spring of 2018. She alleged that her manager tried to get Glasson to encourage the woman to leave her team, or the company altogether, and that after she reported the misconduct, instead of an investigation into the accused manager, her complaint was reported to the manager.

Glasson said she hired an attorney who sent Google a demand letter which requested a lateral internal transfer, an investigation into retaliation, and prevention of further retaliation. While she was healing from her caesarean section on an extended maternity leave, she said she was presented instead with a "walk-away agreement", offering three-months' salary worth of severance in exchange for leaving Google, release of legal claims, and signing a non-disclosure agreement (NDA). Glasson refused to sign it, and stayed at the company until she voluntarily left in August 2019, after she says she was given a poor performance review during her second maternity leave. She said the performance review came after a "shallow" investigation into some of her discrimination claims, which ultimately resulted in Google finding no policy violations. Google suggested she utilize the company's employee assistance program (EAP) for free therapy, which she did.

Glasson said that as a manager at Google, she was instructed to encourage the use of EAP counseling to distressed employees. She said that, after her own experiences, she believes that human resources teams directing employees to mental health counselors is "meant to stop you in your tracks and silence you", and to communicate that "you're the problem".

In February 2020, Glasson wrote a Medium article alleging that in 2014 she was sexually harassed in a team off-site in Cabo San Lucas, Mexico, by a company leader. Another Google employee also made allegations of sexual abuse against the same leader in 2015. Glasson alleged that after a colleague intervened in the incident in Cabo and reported the leader's behavior to human resources, the human resources team met with her in what she described as an "interrogation", and asked questions like, "How much did you have to drink that night?" She said that to her knowledge, no action was taken against the leader.

She has criticized Google for attempting to "tarnish the reputation" of people who speak out, instead of offering real support and fixing problems.

Glasson has since spoken to the Alphabet Workers Union about her experiences. She warned her former colleagues, "Being a whistleblower so often wreaks havoc on your mental and physical health," and discussed the need for affordable legal and mental health services.

=== 2020–present ===
After leaving Google, Glasson worked at Facebook. In October 2020, Facebook employees spoke out in response to COVID-19 pandemic policies they alleged unfairly benefited workers with children. In response, Glasson wrote a Medium article asking for childless employees to empathize with the struggles their parenting colleagues face, highlighting her own need to take emergency leave when her childcare provider was closed due to the pandemic. She said that implying that parental leave is some sort of vacation or unfair advantage "subjects parents to unconscious bias in performance reviews and downplays the type of support and benefits parents so desperately need".

Between 2021 and 2022, She worked at Compass, Inc., a real estate startup.

In 2021, Glasson contributed to The Tech Worker Handbook, a website of free resources for employees who may be interested in speaking out on issues at their employers.

In 2022, Glasson's story was the subject of the documentary Spread Thin directed by Bashirah Mack. It won the Audience Favorite award at the Workers Unite Film Festival in 2022.

In April 2024, Glasson announced she left the tech industry and enrolled in law school. She said she planned to work in employment law to fill what she believed to be a gender-based gap in the field.

== Legal proceedings with Google ==
Glasson filed a complaint against Google with the Equal Employment Opportunity Commission (EEOC) for pregnancy discrimination on September 3, 2019. The Seattle EEOC office began a probe into Glasson's claims in February 2020. As of July 2020, the case was still under investigation.

In the lawsuit, and her complaints, Glasson alleged that she was told by third parties that her manager was making derogatory comments about her, interfered with her projects, and started interviewing others to replace her. She also alleged that when she reported she was pregnant with her second child that her work environment worsened. She said she tried to move internally, but was convinced to stay on her team after she was misled into believing her manager was leaving. After receiving what she described as unfair and surprising negative feedback, she accepted a demotion on another team, where she alleged she was discouraged from supervisory duties prior to her maternity leave, as it would "rock the boat", and was excluded from manager meetings and off-sites.

Glasson further alleged that after she was diagnosed with placenta praevia, her new manager was dismissive, citing an NPR segment she had heard "debunk[ing] the benefits of bed rest", and her own experience ignoring medically-advised bed rest and delivering "the biggest presentations of [her] career" the day before her own child was born. Glasson further alleged that her manager informed her that she should not expect to be a manager when she returned from her leave.

Google condemned retaliatory behavior, both internally and externally. The company told the EEOC that they had "accommodated each of Ms. Glasson's pregnancy-related requests", and that there was "no support for Ms. Glasson's contention that she suffered discrimination or retaliation as a result". They further argued that Glasson was not given direct reports in her last role at the company because of insufficient headcount.

Glasson sent another demand letter to Google requesting the company work with the Center for Parental Leave Leadership to train managers at the company on supporting new and expecting parents to prevent others from facing the same types of discrimination and retaliation that she alleges she faced, and asking for payment for emotional damages and reimbursement for her legal expenses. Google declined the settlement offer.

During her lawsuit, which was scheduled for trial in January 2022, Facebook and Compass were subpoenaed for Glasson's employee records, including payroll information, performance reviews, any complaints raised by Glasson against those employers, and any and all communications referencing Google. She also said that because she is suing for emotional damages, Google received all of the notes from the counseling she was provided by the company's EAP, including private information about her marriage and sex life. She referred to the process as "intrusive", and said there were "very few limits to what a corporation like Google can ask in discovery". She later reported that more than a year later, the therapist suggested they stop their sessions and she find another provider as soon as she filed the lawsuit. Kristi Lee, an associate professor at Seattle University, said this sounded like "client abandonment", a violation of a formal ethical code for counselors. The New York Times discovered that Lyra Health, the healthcare provider used by Google and Facebook as of February 2022, allowed the company to share information without the client's consent if it was "required to do so by a court order or other legal requirement". A bill introduced in Washington State Legislature in January 2022 would prohibit that in the future, if passed into law, and the incident and therapist were placed under investigation by the Washington State Department of Health (WSDOH) after Glasson filed a complaint.

In October 2021, Glasson wrote a Medium article about her experiences as a whistleblower and with the lawsuit against Google, and said that she had already spent $56,000 on the lawsuit. She also started a GoFundMe campaign to help with the legal costs.

Glasson and Google reached an undisclosed settlement in February 2022. Glasson later wrote a book about her experiences, titled Black Box: A Pregnancy Discrimination Memoir, which was published in September 2023.

== Legislation ==
=== Pregnancy discrimination ===
In 2020, Glasson worked with Senator Karen Keiser in the hopes of extending the statute of limitations for reporting pregnancy discrimination. The law only allowed six months to report discrimination, which Keiser said "doesn't make sense" given that "it takes nine months or more to have a baby". Glasson testified before the Washington State Senate on January 16, 2020, for Senate Bill (SB) 6034. The bill passed in both the senate and in the house in March 2020, and was later signed into law, extending the time pregnant workers have to file a complaint to one year.

=== Employee assistant program rights ===
Glasson consulted with Senator Keiser on the incident with Lyra Health sharing her therapy information with Google during her lawsuit, and in November 2021, the senator sent a letter to the WSDOH regarding a "potential conflict" between employers and employees who utilize EAPs. Senator Keiser then introduced a bill, SB 5564, that aims to protect workers' rights, would make it an unlawful practice to take adverse action against workers based on their utilization of EAPs, and prohibit providers from sharing individually identifiable information about employees with their employers. The bill was signed into law in March 2022.

=== Whistleblower protection ===
In October 2021, Glasson said she was inspired by Ifeoma Ozoma's work on California State Legislature's 2021 Silenced No More Act, which made it illegal for companies to use non-disclosure agreements (NDAs) preventing employees from speaking about unlawful conduct such as discrimination and harassment. Glasson contacted Washington state lawmakers in hopes of having a similar law enacted. Senator Keiser and House Representative Liz Berry sponsored the legislation in thanks to outreach from Glasson and Cher Scarlett, a former Apple security engineer who has filed whistleblower complaints about Apple. Both Glasson and Scarlett testified before the Washington House of Representatives for House Bill 1795 on January 18, 2022.

Glasson testified that she was "intimidated" by the NDA she had signed when she joined the company, and by the terminology "Google confidential information", leading her to question whether or not she could speak to attorneys and government agencies about her experiences. Google denied that its NDAs prohibit workers from speaking out about discrimination and harassment. Glasson said in regards to the legislation, "because NDAs were involved, many [workers] can't take action. [This] legislation will provide paths and opportunities for people to share, for people to fight."

The bill was passed into law on March 3, 2022, and is effective as of June 9, 2022, with retroactive coverage. Google committed to Silenced No More protections for all employees following passage of the Washington legislation.

Glasson has also mentioned that her legislative advocacy has been enabled by her status as a tech worker, "With tech workers, part of the reason that we're able to fight is that we are tech workers. There are some industries where your career would be completely annihilated if you were to speak out."

== Selected publications ==
- Glasson, Chelsey (April 6, 2024). "Why I'm yet another woman leaving the tech industry". Fortune.
- Glasson, Chelsey (September 28, 2023). Black Box: A Pregnancy Discrimination Memoir. Carson City, Nevada: Lioncrest Publishing. ISBN 978-1-5445-4117-4.
- Steinhorn, Ariella; Scorah, Amber; Glasson, Chelsey (June 14, 2023). "Companies are spending big money to cover up bullying and discrimination in the workplace–it's time for shareholders to know exactly how much". Fortune.
- Glasson, Chelsey (October 26, 2021). "I sought therapy after my boss at Google discriminated against me. I used a 3rd-party therapist through the company and it was a decision I will forever regret". Business Insider.
- Glasson, Chelsey (March 9, 2021). "Fighting pregnancy discrimination shouldn't be this hard". Fast Company.
- Glasson, Chelsey (April 2013). "Editor's Note: Let's Talk About User Experience Careers". UX Magazine.
- Glasson, Chelsey (August 2011). "From One Student to Another: Advice for Beginning a Career in User Experience". UX Magazine.

== Personal life ==
Glasson resides in Seattle, Washington with her husband, an attorney, and two children.

== See also ==
- Timnit Gebru
- Margaret Mitchell
- Claire Stapleton
- Meredith Whittaker
