= All-Workers Militant Front =

Greek trade union federation

All-Worker's Militant Front
- Πανεργατικό Αγωνιστικό Μέτωπο
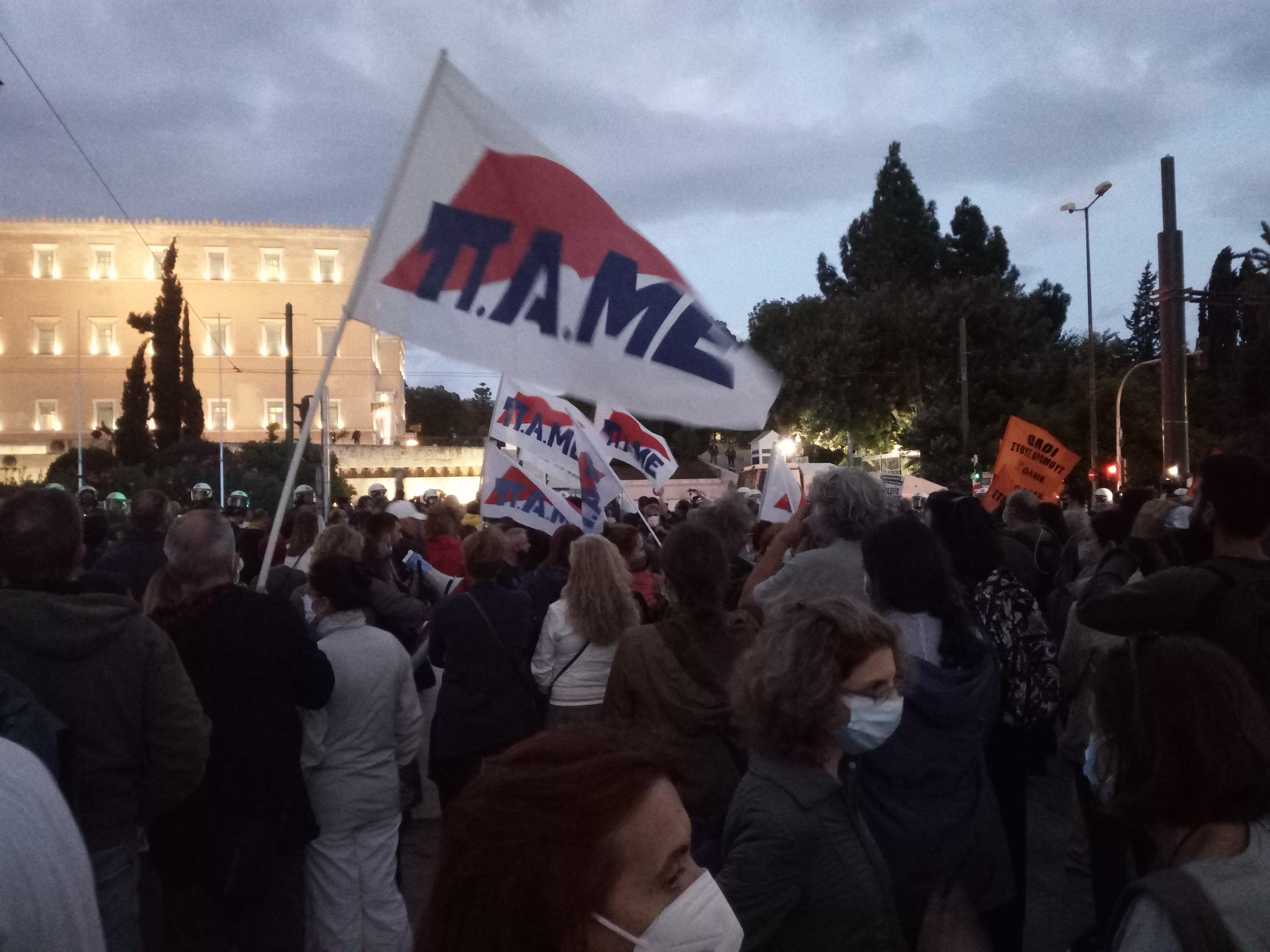
- Founded: April 1999
- Headquarters: Athens
- Members: 850,000
- Affiliations: WFTU
- Website: https://pamehellas.gr/

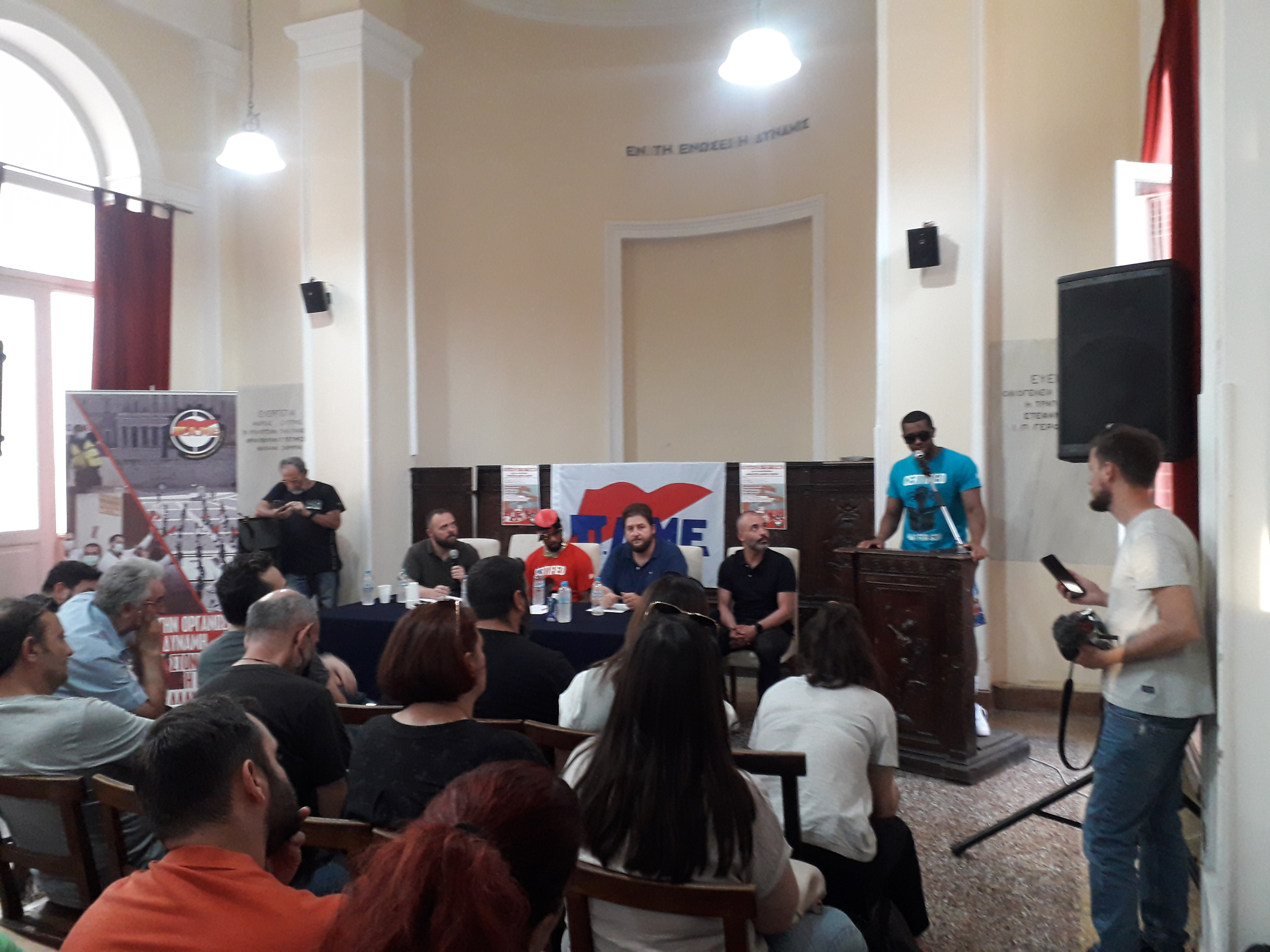
Derrick Palmer (at the podium) and Chris Smalls (middle) participating at a PAME event in Athens

The All-Workers Militant Front (Greek: Πανεργατικό Αγωνιστικό Μέτωπο, ΠΑΜΕ; Panergatiko Agonistiko Metopo, PAME) is a coordination centre within the Greek trade union movement, founded on the initiative of Communist Party of Greece trade-unionists in April 1999.

Among its members are unionists coming from different political backgrounds. Founding members were also cadres of DIKKI and others. PAME is critical of the official positions and leadership of the General Confederation of Greek Workers. According to its website, the trade unions that are affiliated in PAME have 415,000 members in total as of 2005. As of June 2012, according to the Communist Party of Greece, PAME affiliated unions have 850,000 members. In November 2016 PAME held its 4th National Congress with 1200 national delegates representing 13 National Federations 14 Labour Centres 451 trade unions 52 Workers' Committees. PAME is internationally affiliated with the World Federation of Trade Unions since 2000.
