= Congress of Essential Workers =

American labor organization

- Formation: May 1, 2020; 5 years ago
- Founder: Chris Smalls, Gerald Bryson, Jordan Flowers and Derrick Palmer
- Leader: Chris Smalls
- Website: tcoew.org

The Congress of Essential Workers is an American labor organization co-founded by Chris Smalls in 2020. It has campaigned to raise Amazon's minimum wage.

== History ==
The Congress of Essential Workers was launched as the COVID19 pandemic reached the United States, on May 1, 2020. The founders were all current or recent Amazon employees Chris Smalls, Gerald Bryson, Jordan Flowers and Derrick Palmer. The organization was created to advocate for essential workers, with special focus on those who were the subject of employer retaliatory actions and those who needed funds to pursue civil rights complaints.

The group was worried about COVID-19 infection risks, and were part of a larger group that has walked out of the New York factory known as JFK8 where they were employed on March 30, 2020. Smalls' employment had been terminated shortly after the walkout. Initially the group were not in favor of formal unions, until April 2021, when the Retail, Wholesale and Department Store Union failed to organize a union amongst Amazon workers in Bessemer, Alabama.

== Organization ==
The congress is led by Chris Smalls who was fired by Amazon shortly after organizing a walk-out of the Amazon warehouse where he worked. The group called on Amazon to raise the minimum wage from $15 per hour to $30 per hour. The work that the Congress of Essential Workers started, led to the development of the Amazon Labor Union.
