= Richard Bensinger =

American labor unionist

Richard Bensinger is an author, American labor activist, and labor consultant known for his advocacy of expanded organizing efforts. He is the founder of the Organizing Institute and was the first organizing director of the AFL-CIO. He is currently the acting organizing director for the United Auto Workers union.

== Life and career ==
After attending the University of Colorado at Boulder, Bensinger began his involvement with labor as a Head factory worker, where he helped organize the plant. After working as a volunteer organizer for the Clothing Workers Union, he became the union's regional director. In 1986 he moved to Washington, D.C. to found the Organizing Institute, and in 1994 he became the first person to hold the position of National Organizing Director for the AFL-CIO.

While there, Bensinger emphasized the need for unions to rebuild their shrinking base of popular support, and encouraged locals to put more money in organizing efforts. “Two years ago only 15 local unions out of the thousands in this country had moved 20% of their budgets into organizing. … Today, 150 have,” Fortune magazine reported him as saying shortly before being fired from the AFL-CIO position in 1998.

Bensinger was removed from his position by then-president of the AFL-CIO John Sweeney, who replaced him with an SEIU career staffer, citing reasons of ineffectiveness.

Bensinger now spends his time consulting for international unions on organizing strategies in the U.S. and Canada, and educating corporations and businesses on ethics in labor relations. He is also the author of Reaching Higher, a guidebook on best organizing practices for non-unionized employees hoping to form a union.

In 2002, Bensinger co-founded the Institute for Employee Choice with Dick Schubert, a former president of Bethlehem Steel. During the political fight over the Employee Free Choice Act, or “card check” legislation, Bensinger and Schubert suggested a third way to conduct elections that relied not on laws passed by the U.S. Congress but on a voluntary code of conduct that would be upheld by both organizers and management. The “Golden Rule” in this code was “Unions and employers need to behave as they would like the other to behave.”

In 2010, United Auto Workers (UAW) president Bob King hired Bensinger to organize Japanese, Korean, and German transplant factories in the United States as part of the UAW's work to increase membership.

As of 2020, Bensinger continues to be paid for consulting work by the UAW, as well as Workers United in Rochester, NY and the United Brotherhood of Carpenters, among others.

In fall of 2021 Bensinger worked with Jaz Brisack and the Workers United campaign to organize workers at 6 Starbucks coffee shops in Buffalo, New York.

== See also ==
- Jane McAlevey
