= 2024 Teamsters Amazon Strike =

Labor dispute in the United States

- Date: December 19, 2024 -December 24, 2024
- Location: California, Georgia, Illinois, and New York
- Caused by: Lack of negotiations between Amazon and the International Brotherhood of Teamsters
- Goals: Increased wages for workers; Better benefits for workers; Safer working conditions
- Methods: Strike action; Work stoppage; Picketing

Parties
Teamsters	Amazon

Lead figures
Sean O'Brien	

Units involved
7,000 workers	

The 2024 Teamsters Amazon Strike was a strike action by the Teamsters against Amazon. The strike began on December 19, 2024 and ended on December 24, 2024. Teamsters claimed it was the largest strike against Amazon, with ten thousand workers, 1.4 percent of Amazon's US workforce, at seven locations in California, Georgia, Illinois, and New York. The strike began after a deadline set by the Teamsters to start negotiations, December 15, 2024, passed without response from Amazon.

Amazon stated that the strike would not impact holiday deliveries and that Teamsters do not represent any Amazon employees. However, the National Labor Relations Board has ruled that one group of employees at one location (Staten Island) belong to a union (Amazon Labor Union, which started independently in 2021 but affiliated with the Teamsters in June 2024), though Amazon has appealed that ruling.

Amazon claimed that the strike was an attempt to intimidate Amazon employees.

== Background ==
Teamsters claimed that Amazon ignored their December 15 negotiating deadline. "We gave Amazon a clear deadline to come to the table and do right by our members. They ignored it," said Teamsters President Sean O'Brien. Amazon denied this claim.

Amazon spokesperson Kelly Nantel claimed that Teamsters is attempting "to push a false narrative" that they represent thousands of Amazon workers. She claimed that Teamsters tried to threaten and coerce Amazon and third-party drivers into joining Teamsters, and that that "is the subject of multiple pending unfair labor practice charges against the union."

=== Third-party drivers ===
Amazon contracts with third-party agencies who employ drivers. These drivers consider themselves Amazon workers, as they are required to wear Amazon uniforms, drive Amazons trucks, and have their routes and packages controlled by Amazon. Amazon does not consider them Amazon employees.

Teamsters argues that they have joint employers under the National Labor Relations Board ruling.

One driver claimed that "these third party contractors don’t exist without Amazon" and were simply an attempt by Amazon to shed negotiating responsibility.

== See also ==
- Amazon Labor Union
- Amazon worker organization § United States
