= Jennifer Bates (labor activist) =

American labor organizer

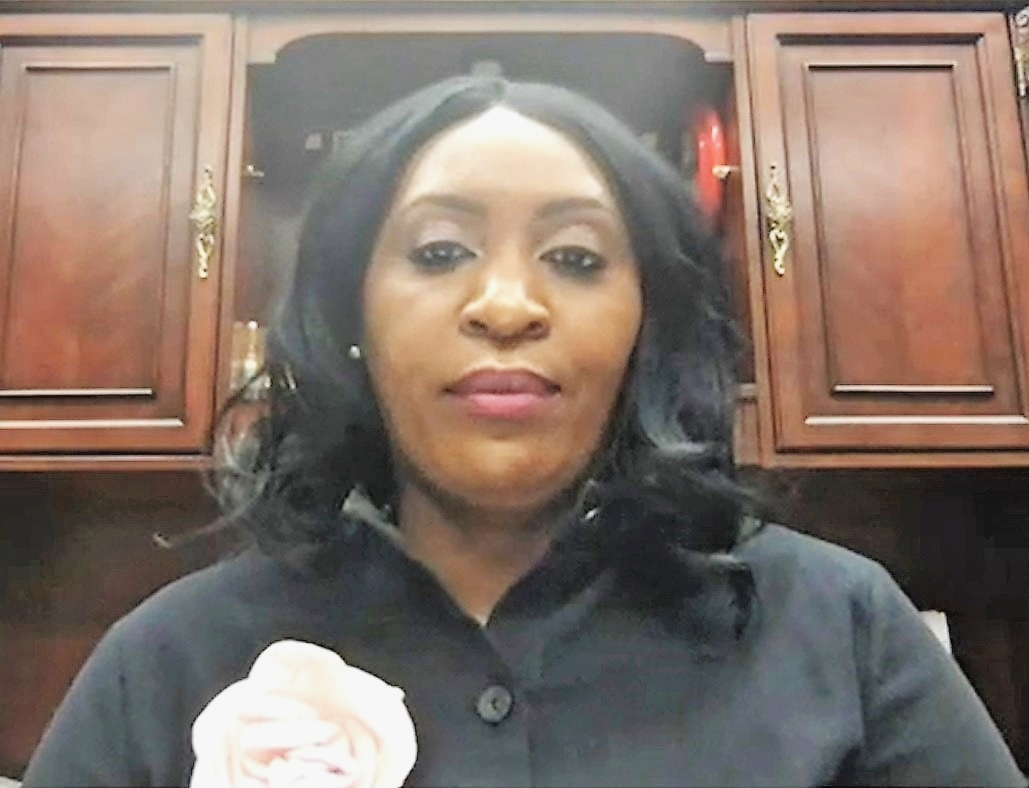
- Jennifer Bates, testifying before Congress in 2021
- Born: 1972 or 1973 (age 53–54)
- Occupation: Labor organizer
- Employer: Amazon
- Known for: Workers' rights activism
- Notable work: Union organizing at Amazon

Jennifer Bates (born 1972 or 1973) is an American labor organizer known for her role in leading Amazon worker organization in Bessemer, Alabama.

== Early life ==
Bates was heavily involved in ministry and outreach work in her community, and was involved in her church in Marion, Alabama, where she grew up. She started working in an okra field owned by her cousin when she was 13. She says her first "legal job" was working at Hardee's when she was 16.

Her career expanded into foodservice, retail, the automotive industry, emergency dispatch, office work, choir direction, and motivational speaking.

Before returning to Alabama in 2007, Bates married a man in the military and relocated temporarily to South Philadelphia, Pennsylvania.

In 2010, Bates joined a United Steelworkers-backed pipe manufacturing plant and worked there for nearly a decade.

== Activism at Amazon ==
Bates joined Amazon in the fulfillment center (BHM1) in Bessemer, which has a population that is predominantly Black, in May 2020 working in stowing, eventually becoming a learning ambassador. Bates said she believed she was guided to the job at BHM1 for a higher purpose, and that she could not sit back and watch people be mistreated. Her prior experiences told her she knew a union could help the workers. She said, "It's about time somebody really spoke out and said something. Somebody who isn't afraid of the big giant."

A few months into her tenure, Bates and Darryl Richardson, one of her coworkers, contacted Retail, Wholesale and Department Store Union (RWDSU) and in November 2020, announced their intention to unionize the 5,800-employee location. The union drive earned national media attention, and the support of Senators Bernie Sanders and Elizabeth Warren, Representative Stacey Abrams, and President Joe Biden.

Bates criticized Jeff Bezos, saying that he did not care about the employees, and compared the benefits and wages Bezos advertised was akin to giving someone "a wheelbarrow and calling it a car", and workers further criticized Amazon's failure to disclose that similar nearby jobs through union contracts offer much better wages and benefits. Amazon has stated it believes most employees are happy with the working conditions, and that they offer some of the best jobs available in the areas they operate. The workers have stated that it's not just about better compensation, it's about human dignity.

On March 17, 2021, Bates testified before the United States Senate at a "The Income and Wealth Inequality Crisis in America" hearing. Bates testified that she and many of her coworkers were living "paycheck to paycheck", which contrasted the increasing wealth gap amongst the COVID-19 pandemic in the United States. She told congress that within three days of starting her new job she was in physical pain and that her sister, who also worked there, warned it was going to worsen, and compared it to exercising for nine hours a day.

Bates alleges that breaks are irregular, determined by algorithms that monitor the workers by the second, and communicated by a supervisor, and overheard a worker being told by a supervisor, "If you don’t go when I asked you to go, you won’t get a break at all." Bates also alleged that in order to take a break, workers are subjected to a security check that involves some measure of undressing, which Amazon has stated is not company policy. Workers have also referred to BHM1 as a "sweatshop", lodging multiple complaints internally about working conditions. She also said that there were plenty of elevators available, but only one of the many elevators was allowed to be used by the workers in the four-story, 855,000-square-foot facility.

In an interview with Elle, Bates also alleged that people who worked in close contact with coworkers infected with COVID-19 were not alerted about the close contact.

The first election results ended in a decisive vote against unionizing after closing on March 29, 2021. 738 workers voted in support of a union, out of the roughly 2,500 ballots counted, a number staggeringly lower than the petitioned authorization cards reported to be over 3,000. Bates, and others, including legal professionals have accused Amazon of union busting, and RWDSU successfully challenged the results of the vote with the National Labor Relations Board (NLRB), with the agency agreeing that Amazon had illegally interfered with the election.

The company held mandatory "Why You Don’t Need Unions" meetings at BHM1, roundtables featuring anti-union workers, text messaged workers, held unusual one-on-one meetings, posted anti-union signs in the bathrooms, and created a website with the slogan "Do it without dues". Bates alleged that after asking a question about union dues during one of the "anti-union" meetings, she was intimidated by a supervisor. RWSDU argued that the meetings spread misinformation designed to discourage the workers from voting in support of a union, and that the website purposefully misled workers into thinking they would have to pay to join the union. Alabama is a state that prohibits union dues. Bates said that a coworker told her following one of the mandatory sessions, "They said if we could vote the union in, they’re going to shut the plant down." The company has denied all allegations of union busting, but did not appeal the NLRB's decision to allow a re-vote.

Amazon had pushed to have a United States Postal Service mailbox on the premises, which was monitored by the company's security, and covered the box in a tent with the slogan, "Speak for yourself, mail your ballot here," which RWDSU had argued any reasonable worker would be led to believe the election was being monitored or even run by the tech giant, discouraging voting in support of the union. Bates referred to the mailbox as "stark physical memorial of a tainted election," and "an ominous reminder for all of us of Amazon's surveillance capabilities." The workers filed a request to have the mailbox removed in January 2022, ahead of the upcoming 2022 election vote, which will be counted on March 28, 2022.

Critics have argued that without financial consequences, Amazon is unlikely to engage fairly with the second election. Bates feels the power dynamics in labor organizing are biased against workers, telling The Hill, "If the [NLRB] doesn't change the laws and put a harsher punishment on employers or CEOs of these companies, the bricks will always be stacked against us." Bates said that one union win would be a "fire starter" for the labor movement within Amazon.

In an essay for Newsweek, Bates pointed out the vital nature workers like her in BHM1 perform, and argued that shareholders should vote in favor of Oxfam's shareholder resolution to place an hourly warehouse worker on the board of directors. The proposal was rejected.

== Personal life ==
Bates has three children and seven grandchildren.

== NLRB campaign record ==
Outcome	Record	Opponent	Vote Count	Date	Facility	Location	Notes
Defeat	0-1	Amazon	738-1,798	April 9, 2021	BHM1	Bessemer, AL	
Defeat	0-2	Amazon	875-993	March 31, 2022	BHM1	Bessemer, AL	NLRB ordered this new election after finding Amazon improperly interfered with the 2021 election

== See also ==
- Jaz Brisack
- Liz Fong-Jones
- Cher Scarlett
- Emma Kinema
- Chris Smalls
