= Amazon Labor Union =

American labor union

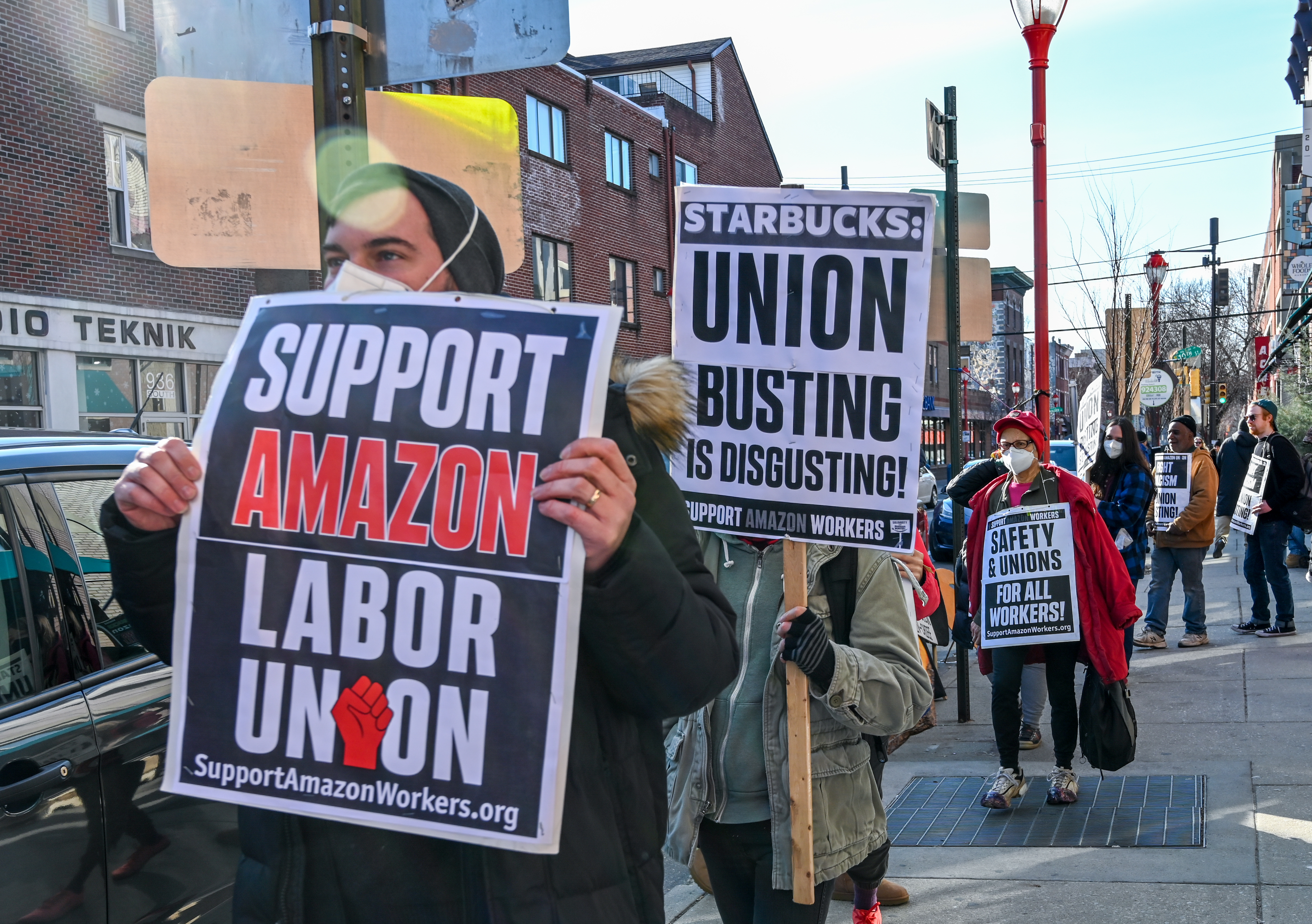
- Supporters in 2022
- Formation: April 20, 2021; 5 years ago
- Type: Labor union
- Purpose: Organized labor for Amazon workers
- President: Connor Spence
- Vice President: Brima Sylla
- Secretary-Treasurer: Kathleen Cole
- Recording-Secretary: Sultana Hossain
- Affiliations: Teamsters union
- Website: www.amazonlaborunion.org

The Amazon Labor Union (ALU) is a labor union specifically for Amazon workers, created on April 20, 2021. On April 1, 2022, the Amazon workers at a warehouse in Staten Island, JFK8, backed by the ALU became the first unionized Amazon workers recognized by the National Labor Relations Board. In June 2024 the union became affiliated with Teamsters.

== History ==
The Amazon Labor Union was founded on April 20, 2021, by a labor-activist group founded by Chris Smalls called The Congress of Essential Workers (TCOEW). Smalls, along with Derrick Palmer, had organized a walkout at the JFK8 facility to protest Amazon's handling of the COVID-19 pandemic, which had led to the firing of Smalls. Smalls' termination was widely criticized by government officials, and prompted Smalls to form TCOEW and lead a number of strike actions.

After assessing the attacks Amazon made against the Retail, Wholesale and Department Store Union during the 2020 Bessemer union drive at an Amazon facility in Alabama, which initially resulted in a now-challenged vote against unionizing, Smalls concluded that he should lead a grassroots movement to organize the ALU. Smalls explained his decision, saying to The Guardian, "If established unions had been effective, they would have unionized Amazon already. We have to think about 21st century-style unionizing. It's how do we build up the workers' solidarity."

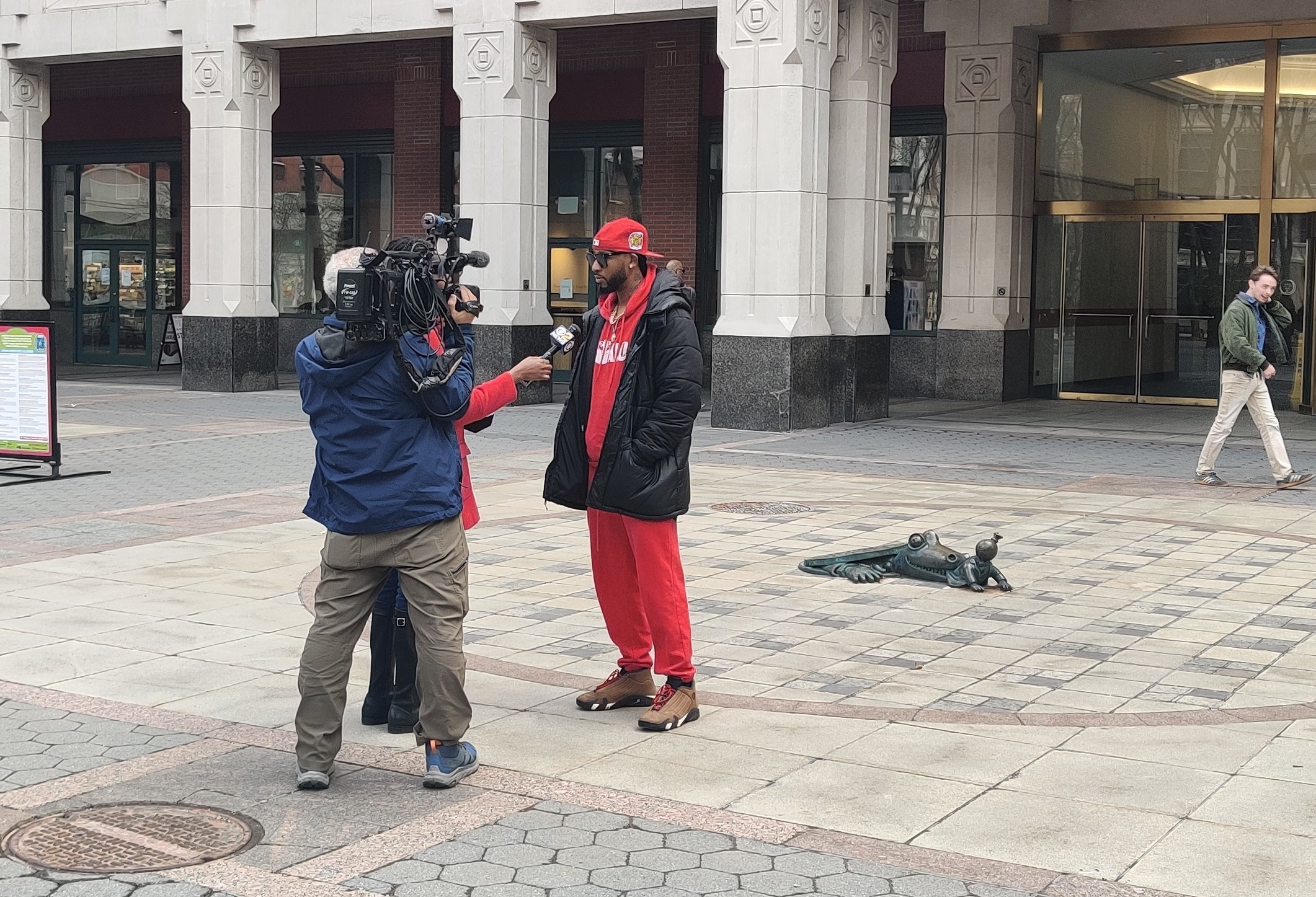
ALU President Chris Smalls speaks with reporters near the NLRB office after the release of vote results.

Over 50 Amazon warehouses contacted the ALU in attempts to organize their own workplaces, with some facilities from Canada, India, South Africa and the United Kingdom asking the ALU for assistance.

In early June 2024, Chris Smalls announced that he signed an affiliation partnership with Teamsters union. On June 17, members of the ALU voted to ratify this affiliation, making it official. Teamsters promised financial resources and to largely preserve ALU's independence.

Later the same year, Teamsters declared a strike against Amazon locations in New York, Georgia, California, and Illinois. Teamsters directly blamed Amazon for refusing to comply with demands, while an Amazon spokesperson insisted that Teamsters are falsely claiming to represent the needs of Amazon workers. The strike was noted as beginning less than a week before Christmas, which concludes what is typically a very busy shopping season in the United States. The trade union claimed that "thousands" of Amazon workers have joined a union, but Amazon has not recognized their union organization.

== Organization ==
Amazon Labor Union is led by President Connor Spence and Vice President Dr. Brima Sylla.

As of March 2023, the union receives funding from outside groups, including a $250,000 contribution from the Omidyar Network.

=== JFK8 warehouse ===
Over a five-day period between March 25 and 30, 2022, workers voted for unionizing the JFK8 warehouse in Staten Island. On April 1, 2022, the ballot count concluded with 2,654 in favor of unionizing and 2,131 voting against, officially resulting with the creation of the Amazon Labor Union as the first independent Amazon union in the United States. The New York Times described the unionization as "one of the biggest victories for organized labor in a generation" and Jacobin wrote that the ALU's achievement was "the most important labor victory in the United States since the 1930s". President Joe Biden congratulated the union, with Press Secretary Jen Psaki stating Biden was "glad to see workers ensure their voices are heard" and that he "believes firmly that every worker in every state must have a free and fair choice to join a union". Amazon submitted an objection to the NLRB, asking for a new election. The company claimed that members of the Union "intimidated employees", "recorded voters in the polling place" and "distributed marijuana to employees in exchange for their support", according to an excerpt from the complaint.

On January 11, 2023, the regional director of the NLRB rejected numerous objections and certified the Amazon Labor Union as the exclusive representative for "all hourly full-time and regular-part time fulfillment center associates employed at the Employer’s JFK8 building". Reviews and appeals were expected to continue.

=== Failed attempt to unionize a second warehouse ===
On March 2, 2022, the NLRB approved an employee election to authorize the unionization of a second of the four New York City warehouses, warehouse #LDJ5. On May 2, 2022, the workers at the second New York City warehouse voted down the proposal to expand the Amazon union to include their warehouse. The vote was 618 against the union to 380 for the union, with 1,600 employees eligible for the vote.

== See also ==
- REI worker organization
- Starbucks unions
- Apple worker organizations
