= Jaz Brisack =

American labor organizer

- Born: August 11, 1997 (age 29)
- Education: University of Mississippi (BA); Wadham College, Oxford (MS)
- Honors thesis: The Wise Women of Oxford (May 2019)
- Employers: Starbucks; Service Employees International Union
- Known for: Workers' rights activism Unionizing Starbucks Buffalo, New York

Jaz Brisack (born August 11, 1997) is an American union organizer, author, and barista. They are known for leading unionizing efforts at Starbucks, namely at a Buffalo, New York store.

== Early life and education ==
Jazlyn Brisack was born in Texas in 1997. They were homeschooled in Alcoa, Tennessee, where they grew up. Their family were conservative Democrats, and they became interested in activism early in their life. At 16, they worked as a dishwasher at Panera Bread where they became familiar with their coworkers’ struggles as low-paid frontline employees in harsh working conditions. They first developed an interest in labor unions there.

They attended the University of Mississippi until 2019, majoring in Public Policy, Journalism, and English. Here they received a Harry S. Truman Scholarship, and were the first non-male at the university to be awarded with a Rhodes Scholarship. They were also a student of the university's honors program, the Sally McDonnell Barksdale Honors College. Brisack finished their scholarship at the Wadham College, Oxford in one year with a Master of Science in intellectual history. They were previously an op-ed writer for The Daily Mississippian, a student newspaper.

== Career and activism ==
=== 2016 to 2019 ===
Brisack started their career in 2016 working as a teacher-advisor for the Sunflower Freedom Project, and in 2017 working part-time in a campaign with United Auto Workers to unionize a Nissan factory in Canton, Mississippi. Nissan was criticized for one of the "nastiest" union busting efforts in history. The union push was unsuccessful. They also worked to help defend Jackson Women's Health Organization. They say their work is inspired by Eugene V. Debs and Mary Harris Jones.

In 2018, one of Brisack's papers, Organizing Unions as Social Policy, was published in the Global Encyclopedia of Public Policy and Public Administration. They also won an award at the Southern Literary Festival in Mississippi. In 2019, Brisack relocated to Buffalo, New York, following Richard Bensinger, whom they had worked with on Nissan unionizing, to start a union organizing campaign at SPoT Coffee. The campaign at SPoT was ultimately successful.

=== Starbucks (2020–22) ===
In 2020, Brisack joined the Elmwood Avenue Starbucks as a barista. Eight months into working there, in July 2021, Starbucks faced a labor shortage amidst the COVID-19 pandemic. Brisack recalled thinking it was "now or never," and launched a then-secret campaign with Bensinger and Workers United to unionize Starbucks. Workers United paid Brisack $68,884 in 2021 and $67,485 in 2022, which they earned in addition to their Starbuck's income.

In late August 2021, Brisack and 48 other baristas in the Buffalo area wrote a letter to Kevin Johnson, Starbucks chief executive officer, informing the company of their intent to form a union. The Elmwood store counted its votes on December 9, 2021 and on December 17, 2021, the National Labor Relations Board certified its union, making it the first unionized Starbucks branch in the USA. Three weeks later, Brisack and the other Elmwood baristas organized a strike after a bargaining meeting regarding protections for workers from the COVID-19 Omicron variant had been unsuccessful. Cassie Fleischer, another organizer and union member at the Elmwood store, told The Washington Post that all of the union's requests were denied, including that the company pay "out-of-pocket costs on coronavirus tests".

When asked by their coworkers if they had joined the store with purpose of starting a union, Brisack clarified that there wasn't a "grand scheme", and that they would try to start a union anywhere they worked. Brisack was also employed by Service Employees International Union (parent union of Workers United) at the time.

Brisack told the press, "We’ve said from Day One that all we had to do was win one store," and said they recognized that to organize a "great" contract with Starbucks, they would need to unionize additional Starbucks stores around the country, and started a grassroots organizing campaign using social media. The campaign garnered the support of the Democratic Socialists of America, Senator Bernie Sanders, House Representative Alexandria Ocasio-Cortez, and a member of Seattle, Washington's city council, where Starbucks is headquartered, Kshama Sawant. As of January 14, 2022, 15 stores had filed for union elections; by May 11, 2022, that number reached at least 170; and by March 2023 over 250 Starbucks cafes had unionized.

Brisack has accused Starbucks of union busting, and pointed to its firing of seven unionizing workers in Memphis, Tennessee as proof, saying "They can’t do this and be the company they say they are." On March 1, 2023, Starbucks was found to have violated labour-laws on hundreds of counts by an administrative judge at the National Labour Relations Board. The company was at the time expected to appeal that decision and has denied the allegations that it is union busting, and claims that the firings were for violations of its security rules. Starbucks has said "Claims of union busting are categorically false. We want our partners to be informed and make the best decisions for themselves".

=== Tesla (2022–) ===
Brisack left Starbucks in September 2022, claiming to have been forced out. They then assisted a Tesla organizing committee at a factory in Buffalo where, as of March 2023, they were also reported to be organizing workers.

== See also ==
- Emma Kinema
- Cher Scarlett
- Liz Fong-Jones
- Jennifer Bates
- Chris Smalls
