= Derrick Palmer =

American labor activist (b. 1988/89)

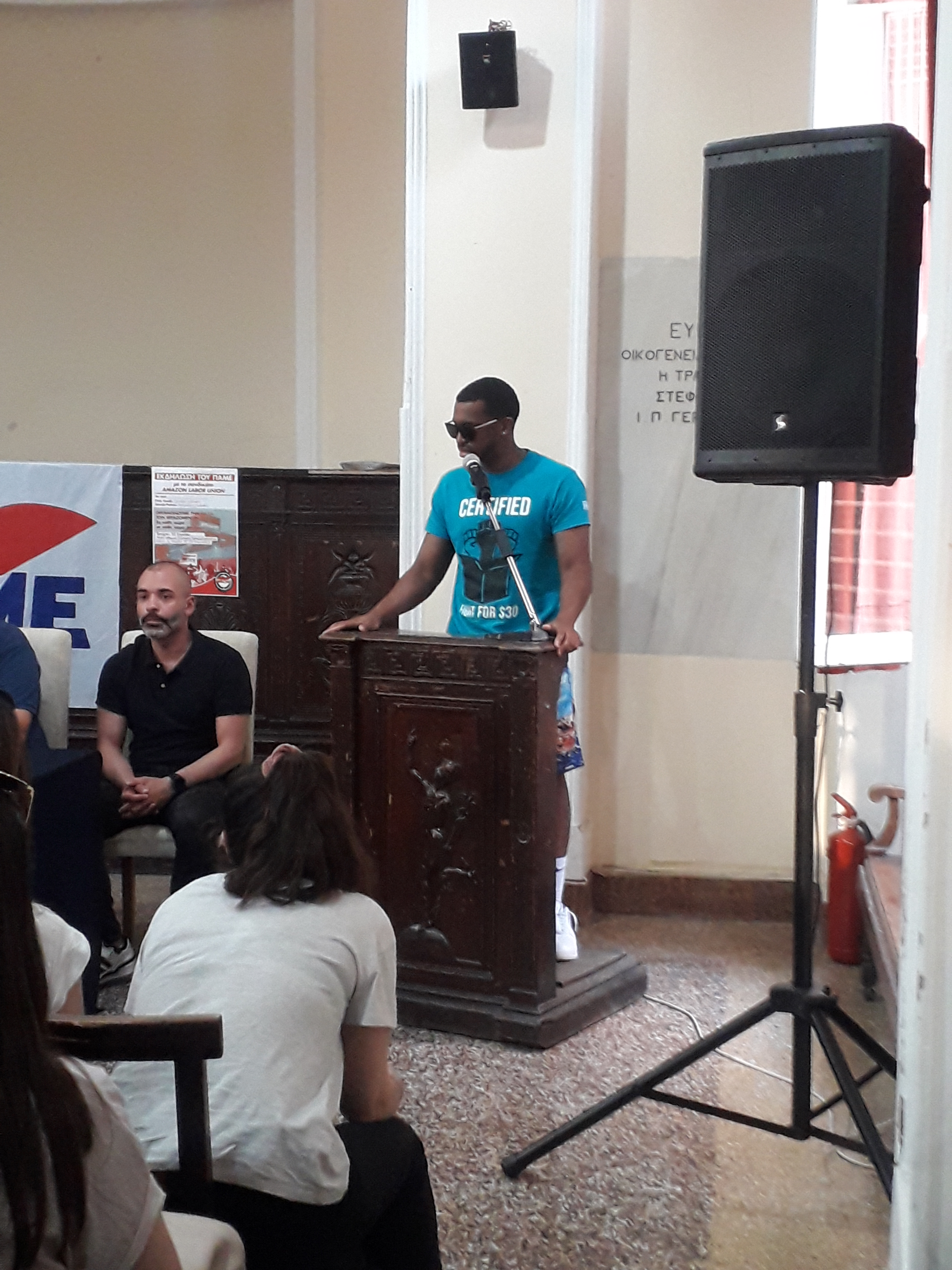
- Derrick Palmer speaking at an All-Workers Militant Front event in Athens
- Born: 1988 or 1989 (age 36–37)
- Occupation: Labor organizer
- Employer: Amazon
- Known for: Workers' rights activism
- Notable work: Amazon Labor Union

Derrick Palmer (born 1988 or 1989) is an American labor activist and whistleblower. He was Vice President of Organizing of the Amazon Labor Union. He works at the Amazon JFK8 sorting facility on Staten Island.

== Early life and education ==
Palmer grew up in Piscataway, New Jersey to a single mother who worked in the pharmaceutical industry. In high school, Palmer attempted to play football, but said it wasn't for him. His mother enrolled him in theater, which he enjoyed and led him to aspire to become an actor. Palmer attended community college, but dropped out.

== Activism at Amazon ==
Palmer joined Amazon in a warehouse in Robbinsville Township, New Jersey in 2016 where he counted product inventory. He later transferred to New York City's JFK8 warehouse, where he is in singles pack department currently. Derrick packs and water spiders during his work week ensuring customers receive their packages on time.

After Palmer's best friend from the warehouse, Chris Smalls, was forced out due to what Amazon said was a violation of the company's social distancing policies, the two decided to start a unionization effort. Together they started the Amazon Labor Union.

The JFK8 warehouse voted in favor of unionizing on April 1, 2022.

Palmer and Chris Smalls were named two of Time Magazine's 100 most influential people of 2022.

== Palmer v. Amazon ==
On June 3, 2020, Palmer and two other colleagues, along with three of their family members, filed a lawsuit against Amazon on behalf of JFK8 employees and their families. They are represented by Make the Road New York, Public Justice, Terrell Marshall Law Group, and Towards Justice. The lawsuit alleged that Amazon "unreasonably" interfered with the workers' right to public health and failed to follow Centers for Disease Control and Prevention recommendations and New York State public health laws, resulting in an alleged breach in Amazon's duty to provide a safe working environment. The lawsuit was dismissed on November 2, 2020, after Judge Brian Cogan determined the jurisdiction was with the Occupational Safety and Health Administration. The legal team filed an appeal on November 24, 2020.
