= Organizing Institute =

- Train to Win
- Nickname: The OI
- Established: 1989; 37 years ago
- Type: Institute
- Headquarters: Washington, D.C.
- Location: United States
- Methods: Training, apprenticeships
- Fields: Union organizing
- Owner: AFL-CIO
- Parent organization: Organizing and Field Services Department
- Website: Official website

The AFL–CIO Organizing Institute (best known as "the Organizing Institute," and often as simply "the OI") is a unit within the Organizing and Field Services Department of the American Federation of Labor and Congress of Industrial Organizations. Founded in 1989, the OI serves as the primary training body for most organizers in the AFL–CIO and its member unions.

Despite its small budget, size and organizational status, the OI has played a major role in the history of the AFL–CIO. The OI has been described as the "AFL–CIO's most innovative initiative on the external organizing front".

Since its inception, the OI has trained more than 7,000 union members as "member-organizers" and another 3,000 staff organizers (1,000 of whom were new to the labor movement). Nearly a third of its new staff organizers are college-age or college graduates.

== Structure and programs ==
The following information on the OI has not been updated with the post 2005 information.

The Organizing Institute was created in the spring of 1989 to promote and foster union organizing. The OI's primary program is to train union members and non-members to be labor organizers. The OI currently provides two training programs: A two-day training program for union members who will return to the workplace, and a three-day training program for union members and others who wish to become full-time organizers. Attendees in the two-day program are usually "sponsored" by an AFL–CIO union, which pays for their tuition, room and board. Most attendees in the three-day program are not sponsored by an AFL–CIO union. During the training programs, attendees are assessed on their organizing skills and ability to learn by OI staff and other experienced union organizers. Sponsoring unions are encouraged to utilize OI graduates in ongoing internal and external organizing campaigns. Participants not sponsored by a union are given career counseling regarding job prospects and additional training and/or education upon graduation.

Graduates of the three-day training program who receive a high assessment from evaluators are eligible to participate in the OI's three-month field training program. Within nine months following graduation from the three-day training program, the graduate will be placed in an actual union organizing campaign. Successful completion of the field training is highly valued by AFL–CIO unions, and placement rates for field-trained organizers tops 90 percent.

The OI also offers two-to-three day training programs tailored to meet the needs of organizers and members involved in an existing organizing campaign.

== History ==
The OI has its roots in a failed organizing drive conducted by the AFL–CIO in the early 1980s. In 1979, the AFL–CIO began a large organizing project in the Deep South. The main thrust of this organizing effort came in Houston, Texas. Known as the Houston Organizing Project, the multi-union effort was budgeted at $1 million a year (nearly $2.5 million in inflation-adjusted 2007 dollars). But as the recession of the early 1980s took hold and employers vigorously resisted the AFL–CIO's efforts, the Houston Organizing Project collapsed.

Partly in response to the collapse of the Houston Organizing Project, in 1983 the AFL–CIO executive council began an extensive strategic planning project. A plan was adopted two years later which, among other things, endorsed higher levels of organizing.

Between 1985 and 1988, the AFL–CIO developed what subsequently became known as "the organizing model." The organizing model was introduced to AFL–CIO member unions in a massive, two-day telephone and video conference call on February 29 to March 1, 1988. An AFL–CIO training manual, Numbers that Count, was then published. The manual concluded unions were more effective when they used external, new-member organizing techniques with members who were already organized.

In 1988 and 1989, AFL–CIO secretary-treasurer Thomas R. Donahue initiated discussions which led to the founding of the OI. Donahue, Donahue's assistant, a former director of organizing and field services at the AFL–CIO, the leaders of five AFL–CIO unions, and Richard Bensinger (then organizing director with the Service Employees International Union [SEIU]) concluded that the primary problem with the Houston Organizing Project was not the coalition nature of the project or the recession but that few unions utilized rigorous organizing methods. Although it is not clear when the decision was made to found the OI, the organization was officially launched in the spring of 1989. The AFL–CIO and five unions—SEIU, UNITE, UFCW, AFSCME and the United Steelworkers—agreed to fund the OI.

The OI was established as an autonomous entity under the supervision of the AFL–CIO Organizing and Field Services Department. Bensinger was named the unit's first executive director.

One of the primary goals of the OI in its first years was not only to promote the organizing model but to reinvigorate the labor movement. An essential element in achieving this goal was the recruitment of non-union people into the labor movement. OI staff came to believe that labor organizers were often too old, too discouraged, and too committed to the existing political goals of their unions (which focused on contract servicing rather than organizing) to be effective. Additionally, many of these veteran staff were experienced only in older methods of union organizing, and did not have the skills or inclination to effectively combat new anti-union strategies and tactics utilized by employers. Bensinger and his immediate successors made a significant effort to recruit activists from the environmental, civil rights, and other progressive movements; activists who had experience in militant and disruptive direct action which caught the eye of the press and the public. OI staff believed that these young activists would bring a new level of commitment and energy to the labor movement.

The establishment of the OI angered some AFL–CIO staff, particularly those in the organizing department. They felt that the organization duplicated their efforts. But they also resented the ways in which AFL–CIO elected leaders and appointed staff denigrated their efforts and promoted the leaders and staff in the OI. Many veteran staff members felt that the years which they had spent gaining experience and building skills were being dismissed, while inexperienced OI staff with little or no experience in union organizing union-building were being held up as the salvation of the labor movement.

== Impact of the OI ==
Although the "organizing model" did not originate from the OI, the method quickly became associated with it. OI staff adopted the organizing model and strongly advocated its use in both internal and external organizing.

The OI helped train and organize some of the most prominent and effective labor actions of the 1990s. In the early 1990s, the OI recruited and trained activists for the highly effective and public Justice for Janitors campaigns in Los Angeles and Washington, D.C. OI staff also helped recruit and train staff for UNITE's national campaign to organize industrial laundries, and began the first tentative steps toward building a comprehensive campaign strategy for this organizing campaign.

Despite being one of the few concrete outcomes of the AFL–CIO's 1983 strategic planning process, the Kirkland administration did not place a major emphasis on the OI. Its budget remained small relative to the organizing department's, and it was not promoted in significant ways to AFL–CIO member unions. Nevertheless, AFL–CIO member unions held the OI and its staff in very high regard.

During the contested 1995 election for the presidency of the AFL–CIO, the OI became a political football. SEIU president John Sweeney criticized the Kirkland administration for failing to boost union organizing, and pointed to the small budget and lack of focus on the OI as one example. Sweeney promised to dramatically boost the OI's funding and importance. For his part, Lane Kirkland pointed to the establishment of the OI as a major success of his administration. Kirkland later abandoned the race and resigned as president of the federation. His successor and presidential candidate, Thomas Donahue, was able to lay a stronger claim on organizing success because of his role as the primary backer of the OI in 1989. But Donahue's claims were rejected by AFL–CIO member unions, and Sweeney won the presidential race.

Once in office, John Sweeney significantly promoted the OI. Sweeney split the organizing and field services function, and created an independent Organizing Department within the AFL–CIO. Bensinger was appointed the new department's first director. The OI became part of the new department. Its budget increased sharply, and a separate fund was established to subsidize strategic organizing campaigns.

The OI began to wane in influence in the late 1990s. The OI continued to emphasize the organizing model and promote an activist approach to union organizing. However, many of the labor leaders and staff most prominent in organizing began to de-emphasize the organizing model. SEIU president Andy Stern and others argued that large-scale union organizing depended less on organizing methods and more on wholesale restructuring of the labor movement. Other labor leaders and organizers contended that federal labor law was too weak and ill-enforced to adequately protect workers and organizers under the organizing model and that a new model—the comprehensive campaign—was needed.

== Criticisms ==
The OI has been criticized on a number of issues.

Some labor union organizers point out that the organizing model contains a notable flaw. The model has a tendency to promote "staffing up"—an organizing approach which relies on hiring and training large numbers of full-time staff organizers and researchers. These staff organizers are often recruited from outside the ranks of the membership. The staff-driven organizing model, critics say, fails to empower workers, contributes to weak elected leadership, does not educate members about the nature and role of unions, fails to prepare members for effective collective bargaining, and leads to worker dependence on regional or national staff.

Another problem of "staffing up" is the "churn 'em and burn 'em" effect. New Organizers are being recruited into an already crowded marketplace, creating what the AFL–CIO has termed, the "race to the bottom" (competition resulting in wage-undercutting). With unions lacking in real political and financial support of organizing programs, there is no demand for the perpetual supply of entry-level staff. Simply put, supply exceeds demand. Permanent job placement and career development are lacking.

Other critics contend the OI training programs do not go far enough in terms of mentoring and real-world skill-building. The OI, these critics claim, often place new organizers in positions with unions not committed to the organizing model. Without full financial, staff and political support, these new organizers often become disillusioned, suffer burnout, and leave the labor movement. Others learn poor organizing habits, and lose their effectiveness.

The OI has also been criticized for meddling in affiliate politics. In the early 1990s, OI leaders began to realize that many AFL–CIO affiliate unions gave only lip-service to aggressive organizing. The OI subsequently developed a program to "educate" national, regional and local union leaders about the benefits of the organizing model. The education program, promulgated by Bensinger during his tenure as OI director, became an integral part of the AFL–CIO's organizing push after Sweeney named Bensinger director of the AFL–CIO Organizing Department in 1996. But a number of elected union leaders perceived the program as a thinly veiled attempt to interfere in their internal politics. In August 1998, Bensinger resigned as director of the Organizing Department after only 18 months in the position. The education program continued to create problems over the next five years. Bensinger's replacement, Kirk Adams (the AFL–CIO's southern regional director and a former organizing director at SEIU) resigned in January 2000 after only 16 months on the job. Adams' successor, Mark Splain (the federation's Western regional director and a former SEIU organizing director in California), was named as Adams' replacement in May 2000. But Splain resigned in October 2003. Stewart Acuff, deputy director of the organizing department, was named Splain's replacement.

== See also ==
- National Labor College
