= Chris Smalls =

American labor organizer (born 1988)

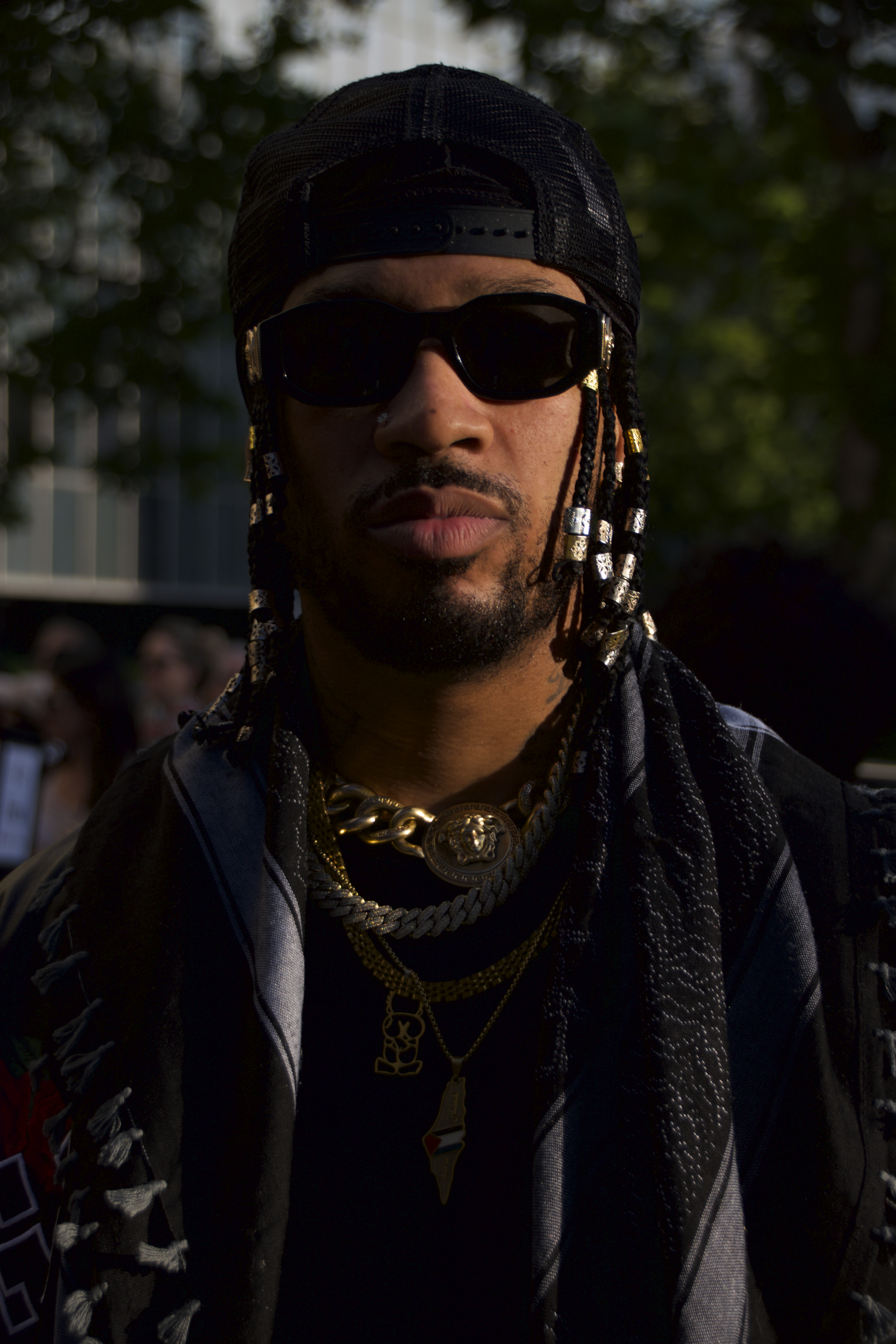
- Smalls in May 2026
- Born: Christian Smalls; July 4, 1988 (age 38); Hackensack, New Jersey, U.S.
- Occupations: Activist, former labor organizer
- Known for: Workers' rights activism
- Notable work: Amazon Labor Union
- Children: 3
- Chris Smalls's voice Smalls introducing himself as the president of the Amazon Labor Union; Recorded April 2022

Christian Smalls (born July 4, 1988) is an American activist and former labor organizer known for his role in organizing Amazon workers in Staten Island, a borough in New York City. He is a co-founder and the former president of the Amazon Labor Union (ALU) (2021–24).

Smalls grew up in New Jersey and pursued a career as a rapper, touring briefly with Meek Mill, but gave this up to support his children by working in the service industry and in warehouses. He was hired by Amazon in 2015.

On March 30, 2020, Smalls organized a walkout to protest what he said was a lack of proper safety protocols around COVID-19 exposures at the Staten Island warehouse he worked at, Amazon JFK8. He was terminated the same day for what the company stated was violating the company's social distancing policies during a required, paid quarantine. Smalls had been exposed to the disease on March 11, 2020, but was not notified or required to quarantine until March 28, after the incubation period had ended. Several government officials criticized the company and demanded the firing be investigated. Smalls and the state of New York also sued Amazon for unlawful termination.

After his termination, Smalls founded a worker-activist group called The Congress of Essential Workers, which later backed the formation of the ALU on April 20, 2021. The JFK8 warehouse voted in favor of unionizing with representation of the ALU on April 1, 2022. He was subsequently named one of Time's most influential people of 2022.

Smalls’ leadership of the ALU was in doubt following two failed NLRB votes, and Smalls did not seek reelection. In July 2024, Smalls was replaced by Connor Spence.

== Early life and education ==
Smalls was born and raised in Hackensack, New Jersey, by a single mother who worked as an administrator at a hospital. As a teenager, he began working jobs and played basketball, football, and ran track and field at Hackensack High School. He had hoped to play in the National Basketball Association, until he was run over in a hit and run while working a job as a car attendant.

Smalls attended a community college in Florida, but missed his home after one semester, and returned to New York to study sound engineering at the Institute of Audio Research. He said he dropped out because he thought he was "hot shit" and started making music as a rapper, touring briefly with Meek Mill. He then gave up his music career pursuit to support his children with a series of jobs, including at Walmart, Home Depot, and MetLife Stadium from 2012 to 2015. He says his friends say of him now, "I guess your voice was meant for something else." Smalls also worked as a warehouse worker at FedEx and Target.

== Amazon ==
=== 2015–2020 ===
Smalls joined Amazon in 2015 as a picker in New Jersey. He transferred briefly to a warehouse in Connecticut, where he was fired and reinstated after an appeal. He was transferred to the Staten Island warehouse (JFK8) when it opened in 2018, and worked as an assistant manager. Smalls said that he was transferred because of good performance, but applied for management positions 49 times during his career, and was never selected for the promotion, which he believes was reflective of systemic racial discrimination he observed in the company. Smalls said that he liked working at the company for a while, until he started to recognize what he alleged to be "deep systemic" issues within the company. He alleges Amazon has issues with safety protocols, citing the injury rate, ageism, sexism, racism, and discrimination against caregivers. Amazon has said "We do not tolerate discrimination or harassment in any form," and that they are working to cut their injury rates down and that they "want [employees] to be healthy and safe".

Smalls contacted local politicians, health officials, and Amazon's human resources (HR), after an extremely ill colleague was allowed to come to work with symptoms while waiting on the results of a COVID-19 test. He said that no action was taken by HR. Smalls and Derrick Palmer, another JFK8 worker, organized a walkout on March 30, 2020 in protest of Amazon's safety protocols during the COVID-19 pandemic and calling the company to temporarily close JFK8. He challenged the company's personal protections and lack of social distancing, and alleged that it failed to disclose a worker's COVID-19 illness to the workforce. Smalls had been exposed to the confirmed case on March 11, 2020, but was not notified until March 28, 2020, prompting him to file a complaint with the New York State Department of Health.

On the same day of the walkout, Smalls was fired by Amazon. The company's senior vice president (SVP) of policy and press, former White House Press Secretary Jay Carney, claimed on Twitter that Smalls had violated the company's social distancing policies, and that he was on a paid 14-day quarantine after being exposed to someone who had tested positive for COVID-19 when he staged the walkout. However, the quarantine would have ended on March 25, 2020, if the company had started it during the incubation period for Smalls' exposure.

Letitia James, the Attorney General of New York, accused Amazon of unlawfully discharging Smalls, and later ordered a probe into the matter, after initial investigations revealed a "chilling effect" from the firing. James's investigation found that the company had illegally terminated Smalls, and filed for an injunction that would force Amazon to rehire Smalls.

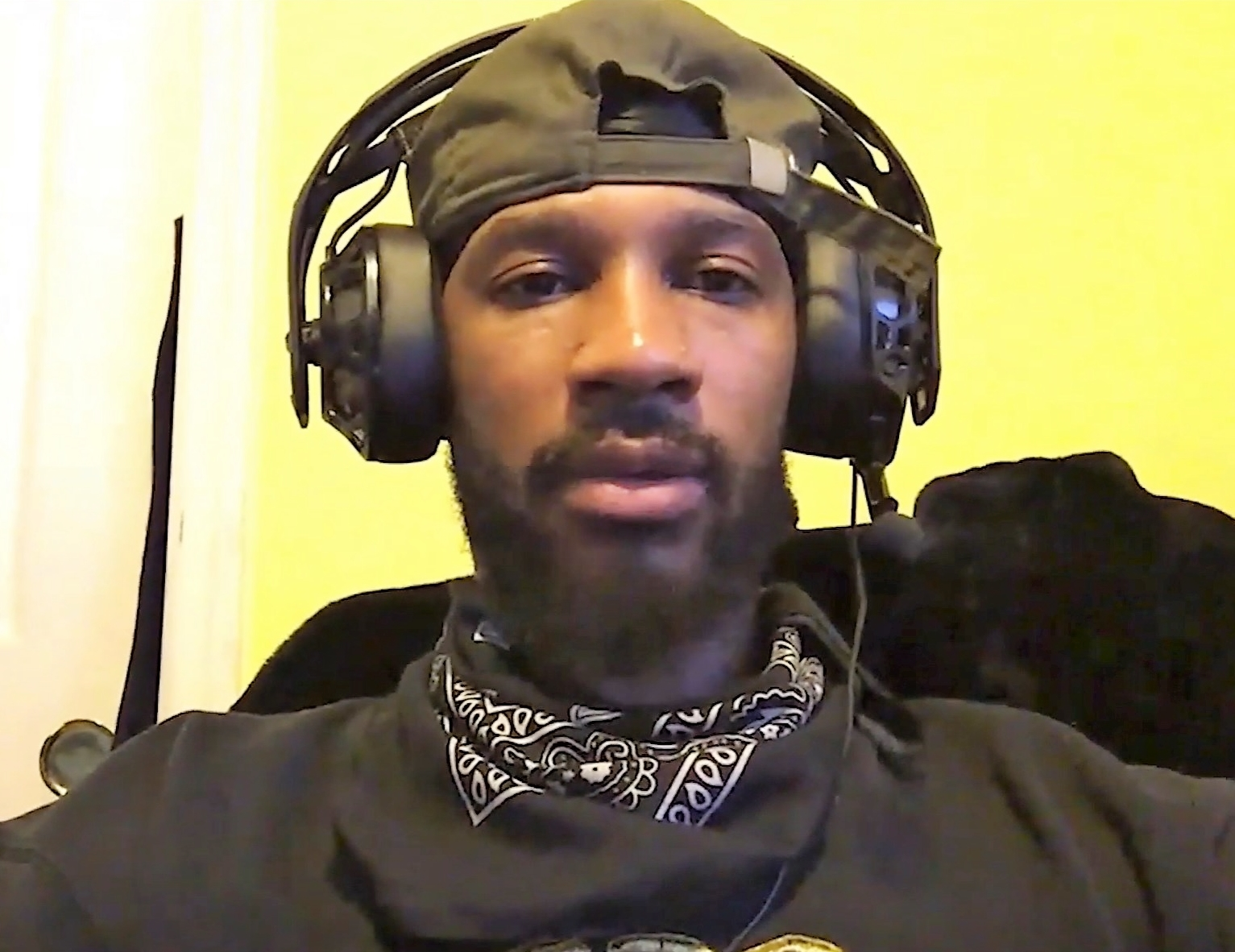
Smalls in 2020

Bill de Blasio, the Mayor of New York City, and Senator Bernie Sanders referred to the termination as "disgraceful". De Blasio ordered the city's human rights commissioner to investigate Smalls' dismissal and James called on the National Labor Relations Board (NLRB) to investigate the discharge. Nine senators, including Elizabeth Warren, sent a letter to the company demanding more information about Smalls' termination, along with the firings of three other whistleblowers. The country's most prominent union leaders sent a letter to Jeff Bezos, Amazon's chief executive officer, demanding that Smalls be reinstated. Tim Bray, the former VP of Amazon Web Services quit over the dismissals, citing in a blog post, "I'm sure it's a coincidence that every one of them is a person of color, a woman, or both, right?"

On April 2, 2020, a memo from a daily brief with Bezos was leaked to Vice referring to Smalls as "not smart or articulate". The note came from Amazon's General Counsel, David Zapolsky, who further urged that it would be good public relations to make Smalls "the face of the entire union/organizing movement" and "layout a case" for why Smalls' conduct was "immoral, unacceptable, and arguably illegal". Smalls referred to the remarks as "definitely racist". Zapolsky denied knowing that Smalls was Black at the time of his statements, and released a statement saying he was "frustrated and upset" that an Amazon worker would "endanger the health and safety of other [Amazon workers]". U.S. Representative Alexandria Ocasio-Cortez stated, "Amazon’s attempt to smear Chris Smalls, one of their own warehouse workers, as 'not smart or articulate' is a racist & classist PR campaign." Smalls said that the company was more interested in squashing bad PR than protecting its workers and their families. Amazon spent over $4 million in response to the efforts to unionize workers.

=== 2020–present ===
==== The Congress of Essential Workers ====
After his discharge from Amazon in 2020, Smalls founded The Congress of Essential Workers (TCOEW), a labor-activist group. On May 1, 2020, Smalls and TCOEW helped orchestrate a May Day strike at Amazon, Target, Walmart, and other large companies across the country. On October 5, 2020, the group staged a Prime Day protest, in which around 100 people marched from Will Rogers Memorial Park to Bezos' mansion worth $165 million in Beverly Hills, California to ask for $2 per hour raises.

==== Amazon Labor Union ====
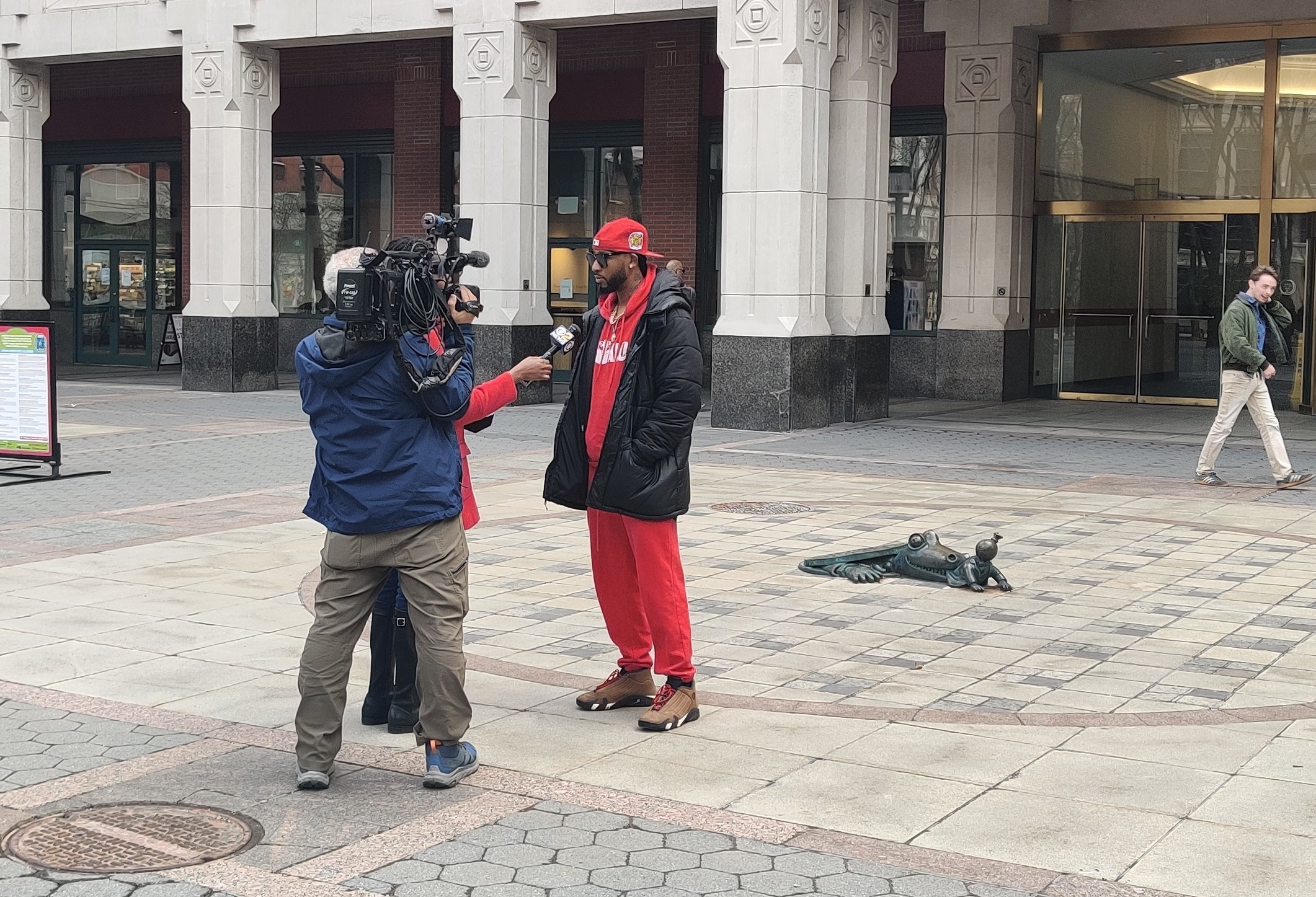
Smalls being interviewed by reporters after the announcement that workers had voted to form a union

On April 20, 2021, Smalls established the Amazon Labor Union (ALU), backed by his labor-activist group, TCOEW. He said that unionizing is important for job security, living wages, paid time off, and medical leave. Smalls said that two of the organizers, current Amazon employees, had been living out of their cars. An Amazon spokesperson said that a union would get in the way of employee bargaining. He also said that the company has invasive surveillance of workers to monitor their time, in order to evaluate performance and determine break times, which is a motivator for unionizing, saying "Who wants to be surveilled all day? It's not prison. It's work." Amazon has said that they "don't set unreasonable performance goals", but the company was fined by the Washington State Department of Labor and Industries (L&I) for "monitoring and discipline systems" in direct relation to workplace musculoskeletal disorders. The company has disputed L&I's findings.

In order to gather signatures for a union authorization vote, Smalls set up a tent alongside a public transit stop near JFK8 with a sign that read, "Sign Your Authorization Cards Here". He has accused the company of union busting, including posting anti-union signs in the bathrooms, sending anti-union text messages to workers, surveilling organizing workers, and holding mandatory meetings with anti-union "falsehoods", like that in signing an authorization card "you give up the right to speak for yourself". Smalls also alleged that Amazon is warning its workers of expensive union dues, and harassing and scaring employees.

Smalls said he combatted the anti-union push by exposing it to the public and providing pro-union messaging, like that "unionized workers make $11,000 more per year than non-union workers on average," an amount much higher than the average cost of union dues.

On January 26, 2022, the ALU announced they had reached enough signatures to petition a vote with the NLRB. Smalls also tweeted the news. The vote took place in March 2022, the same time as a union vote in another Amazon warehouse in Bessemer, Alabama led by worker Jennifer Bates.

Another ALU-backed union vote was announced on March 2, 2022, out of the Staten Island warehouse, LDJ5. The warehouse workers voted against unionizing on May 2, 2022.

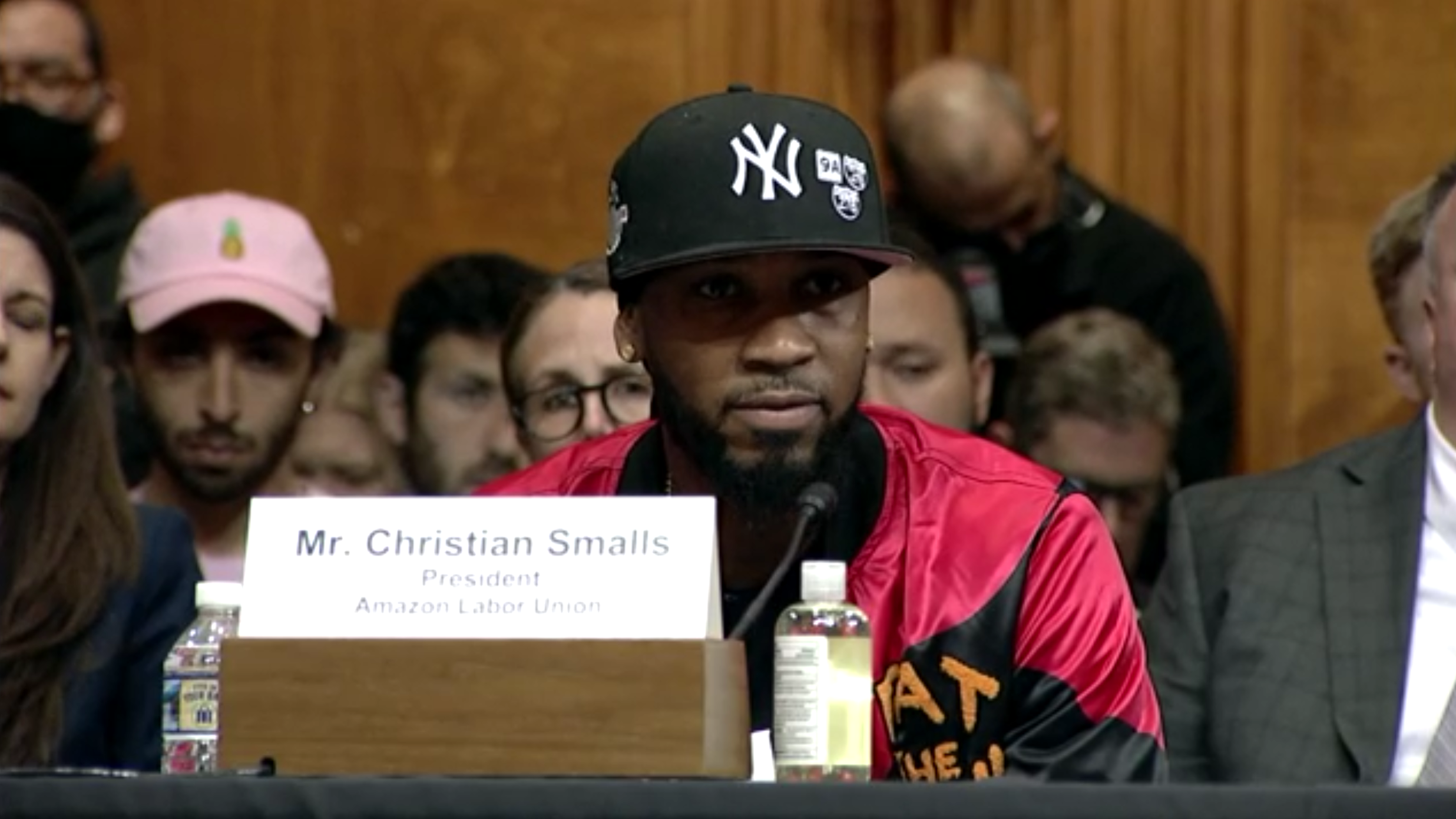
Smalls testifying before the Senate Budget Committee on May 5, 2022

On April 1, 2022, the workers at JFK8 voted 2,654–2,131 in favor of the union. Smalls told a crowd that "We did whatever it took to connect with these workers" and "I hope that everybody's paying attention now because a lot of people doubted us."

In May 2022, Smalls met U.S. President Joe Biden at the White House. Biden told him "I like you, you're my kind of trouble" and "let's not stop".

Smalls and Palmer were named two of Time's 100 most influential people of 2022.

Following the failure of two unionization votes, Smalls’ leadership of the ALU was in doubt, and Smalls did not seek re-election, instead choosing to endorse ALU officer Claudia Ashterman. Ashterman lost to Connor Spence, who was elected ALU president on July 30, 2024. Smalls left the union in 2024.

Smalls attempted to get in to the 2026 Met Gala to protest Jeff Bezos' $10 million donation to the Metropolitan Museum of Art. He was charged with trespassing, and obstruction of governmental administration for jumping a police barrier. The charges will be dismissed if he avoids arrest for six months after the Gala.

Smalls and Carvell Wallace released a memoir, titled When the Revolution Comes: A Fight for the Future of the Working Class, in June 2026.

=== Legal proceedings ===
==== Smalls v. Amazon, Inc. ====
On November 12, 2020, Smalls filed a class-action lawsuit against Amazon alleging the company violated federal and state law by putting warehouse workers at risk during the COVID-19 pandemic and by terminating him. One of Smalls' attorneys, Michael Sussmann, cited racial discrimination as a cause of action. On March 15, 2022, a motion to dismiss filed by Amazon was granted, and on March 21, 2022, a notice of appeal was filed by Smalls.

==== New York v. Amazon, Inc. ====
In February 2021, Attorney General of New York Letitia James sued Amazon for allegedly providing inadequate safety precautions and retaliation against employees who complained, including Smalls. James sought changes in Amazon policies and training, as well as financial compensation for Smalls and the opportunity for him to return to his job at Amazon. The state's lawsuit was dismissed with the court finding the claims were preempted by federal law. The state appealed and Amazon countersued. In 2022 the case was settled with James dropping the appeal and Amazon dropping the countersuit.

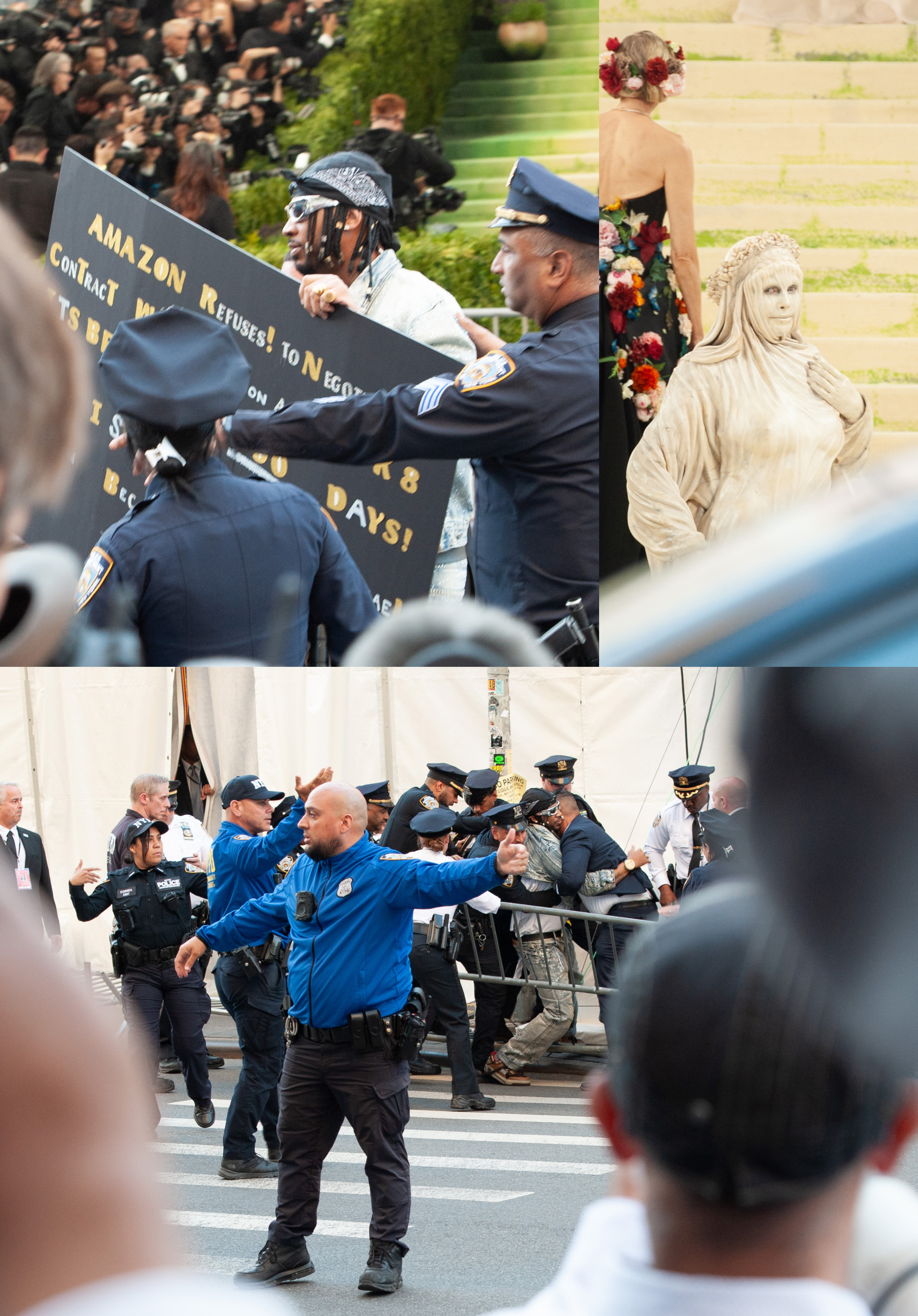
Smalls (left) crashing the 2026 Met Gala before getting arrested. Actress Heidi Klum (right) was on the red carpet at the time.

== Other ventures ==
=== 2025 Gaza Freedom Flotilla ===
In July 2025, Smalls joined several other activists aboard the Gaza Freedom Flotilla, attempting to break Israel's blockade of the Gaza Strip amid the Gaza genocide. Between July 26 and 27, the IDF seized the ship, towed it to the Port of Ashdod, and detained the activists on board, vowing to deport them to their respective countries. Along with most of the detainees, Smalls refused to sign deportation papers, and went on a hunger strike to protest what he viewed as Israel's unlawful arrest of the crew and its starvation of Palestinians in Gaza. Smalls was one of the last two passengers to remain in Israeli custody, being expelled on July 31.

== Personal life ==
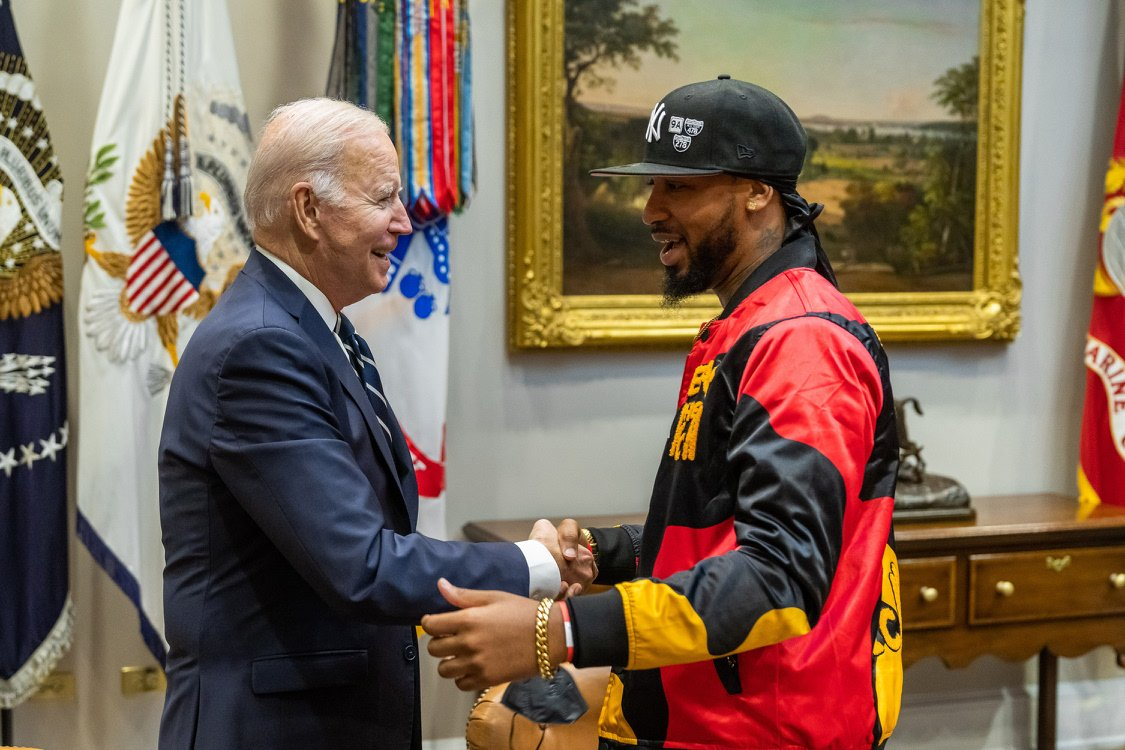
Smalls meeting President Joe Biden, May 2022.

Smalls was married for seven years and has three children, including a set of twins. He is frequently seen wearing streetwear in the style of hip hop culture and has said criticism of his appearance "really motivates me to continue dressing the way I do because I want y'all to understand it's not about how I look" and that "If I was to run for president, I would look just like this ... I'd walk in the White House with a pair of Jordans on because this is who I am as a person".

Smalls is active on Twitter, where he tweets about the ALU and other labor organizing issues. In 2026, Smalls joined UpScrolled.

== NLRB campaign record ==
Outcome	Record	Opponent	Vote Count	Date	Facility	Location	Notes
Victory	1-0	Amazon	2,654-2,131	April 1, 2022	JFK8	Staten Island, New York	First U.S. labor victory against Amazon
Defeat	1-1	Amazon	380-618	May 2, 2022	LDJ5	Staten Island	
Defeat	1-2	Amazon	206-406	October 18, 2022	ALB1	Castleton-on-Hudson, New York	

== Discography ==
Chris Smalls
- Genre: Hip hop
- Years active: 2012
- Label: 5.A.M Fifth Avenue Money

=== Singles ===
- "Complexions" (2012)
- "Do It" (2012)
- "My Time" (2012)
- "Work" (2012)

=== Music videos ===
- "Complexions" (2012); Directed by Harlem Legacy L.L.C
- "Do It" (2015); Directed by 5.A.M Fifth Avenue Money Productions

== Bibliography ==
- Smalls, Chris (June 2, 2026). When the Revolution Comes: A Fight for the Future of the Working Class. Pantheon Books. ISBN 9780593700631.

== See also ==
- Jaz Brisack
- Cher Scarlett
- Liz Fong-Jones
