= Amazon and trade unions =

Collective worker action at the American e-commerce company

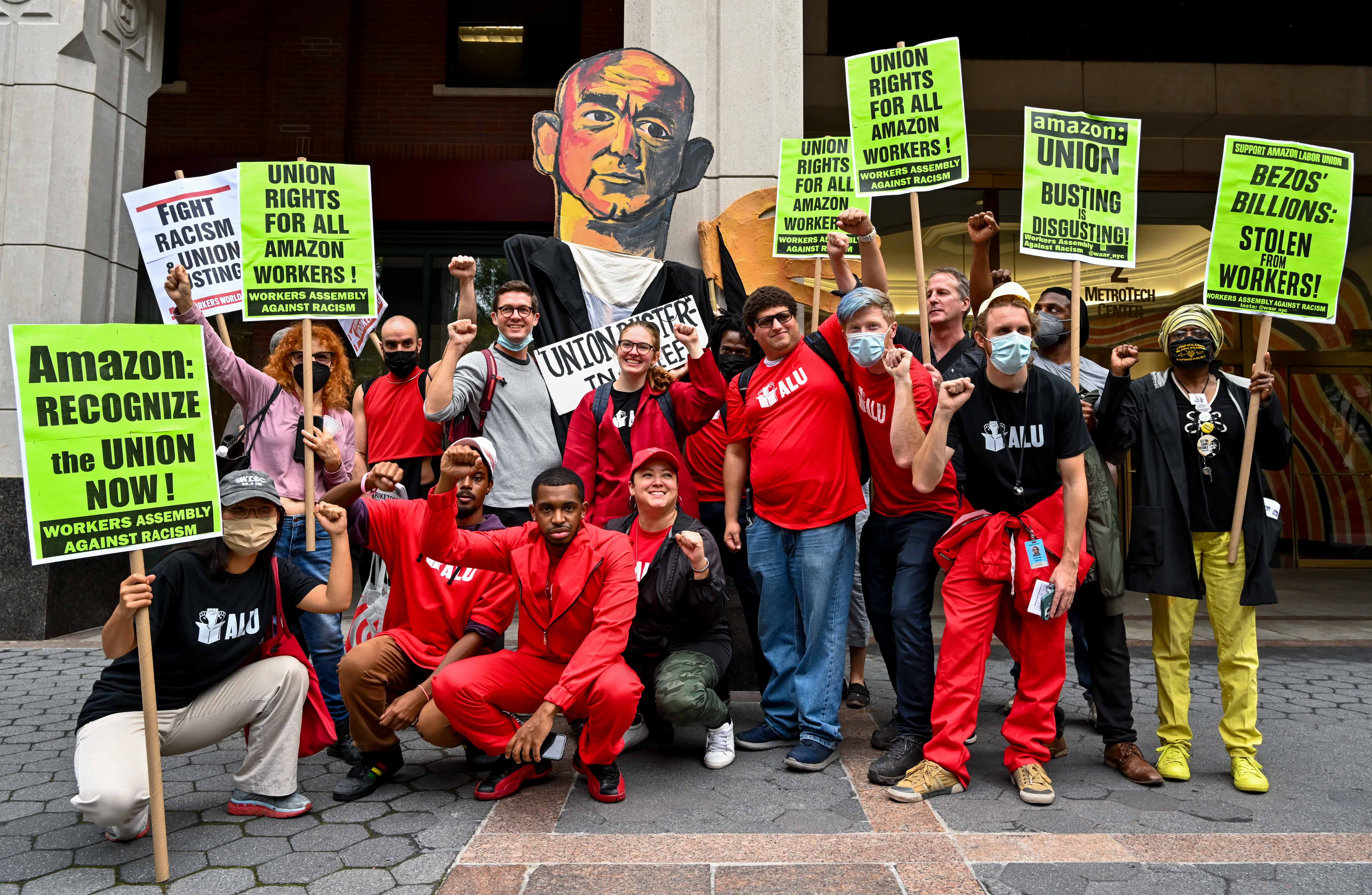
Amazon warehouse workers outside the National Labor Relations Board

Warehouse workers of Amazon, the largest American e-commerce retailer with 750,000 employees, have organized for workplace improvements in light of the company's scrutinized labor practices and stance against unions. Worker actions have included work stoppages, and have won concessions including increased pay, safety precautions, and time off. There are unionized Amazon workers in the United States, Italy and Japan with further unionization activity elsewhere in Europe.

In April 2022, Amazon workers at the JFK8 warehouse in Staten Island, New York City voted in favor of a union, becoming Amazon's first NLRB-recognized unionized workplace in the United States.

== Background ==
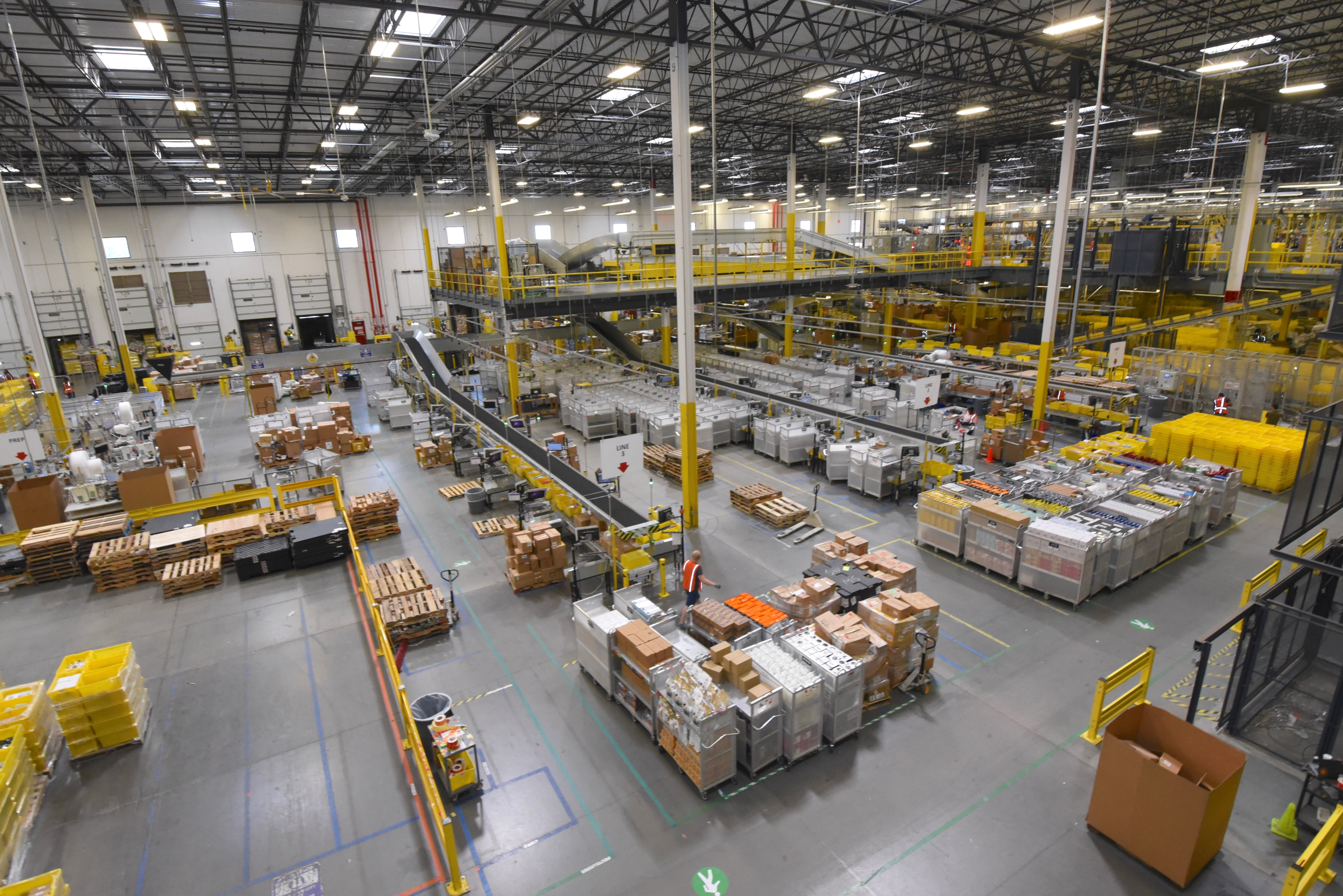
Inside an Amazon warehouse in Maryland

As the second-largest American employer and the largest American e-commerce retailer with over one million workers and rapidly expanding, Amazon's warehouse labor practices have been subject to continued scrutiny, including reporting on work conditions, rising injury rates, worker surveillance, and efforts to block unionization. In the late 2010s, Amazon began to address warehouse wages and training opportunities. Despite increasing its minimum wage to $15/hour, providing healthcare benefits and COVID-19 testing, labor advocates and government officials have criticized Amazon's warehouse working conditions. While unions are common among Amazon warehouse workers in Europe, few of Amazon's American workers are unionized. Amazon has actively opposed unionization in the United States, having stated a preference to resolve issues with employees directly, asserting that unions would impede the company's innovation. Prior to the 2020 Bessemer union drive, Amazon had not faced a major union vote in the United States since Delaware in 2014.

== United States ==
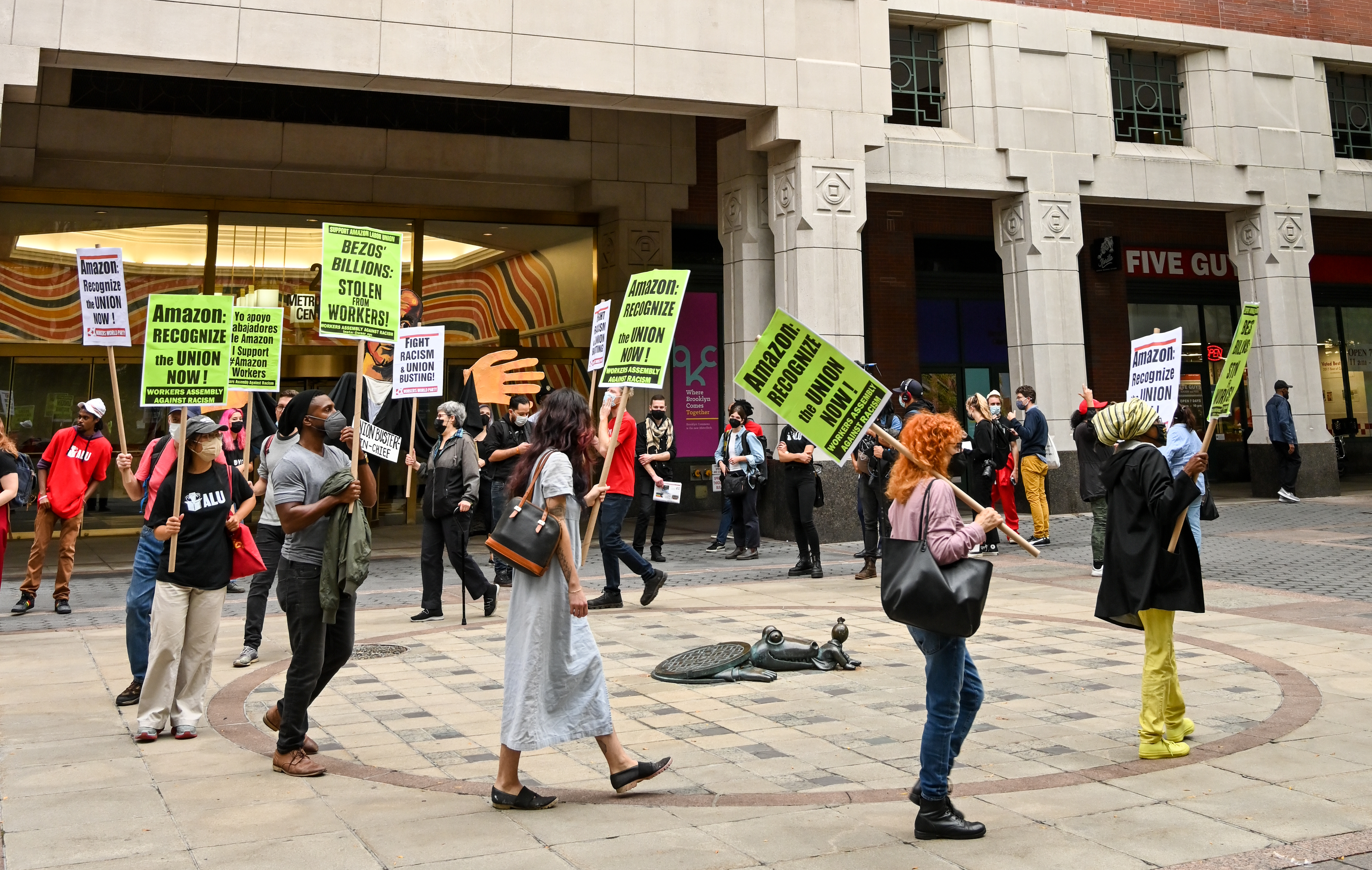
Amazon warehouse workers outside the National Labor Relations Board October 25, 2021

On April 1, 2022, the National Labor Relations Board announced that Amazon workers at the JFK8 warehouse in Staten Island, New York City voted to approve the union. 2,654 voted in favor of a union while 2,131 voted against a union. As of April 2022, the JFK8 warehouse is currently Amazon's only unionized workplace in the United States.

On December 22, 2021, Amazon agreed in a settlement with the NLRB to allow more easily the 750,000 employees in the US to organize including allowing workers to be on property for longer than 15 minutes before and after their shifts for union organizing purposes. Since the beginning of the COVID-19 pandemic, more than 75 complaints have been lodged against Amazon according to the NLRB.

In 2000, the Communications Workers of America and the United Food and Commercial Workers launched unionization drives for Amazon workers after a series of layoffs and a significant drop in employee stock options. In response, the company set up a section on its internal website advising managers on how to spot workers attempting to organize and how to convince them not to. A year later, 850 employees in Seattle were laid off by Amazon after a unionization drive. The Washington Alliance of Technology Workers (WashTech-CWA) accused the company of violating union laws and claimed that Amazon managers subjected them to intimidation and heavy propaganda. Amazon denied any connection between the unionization effort and the layoffs.

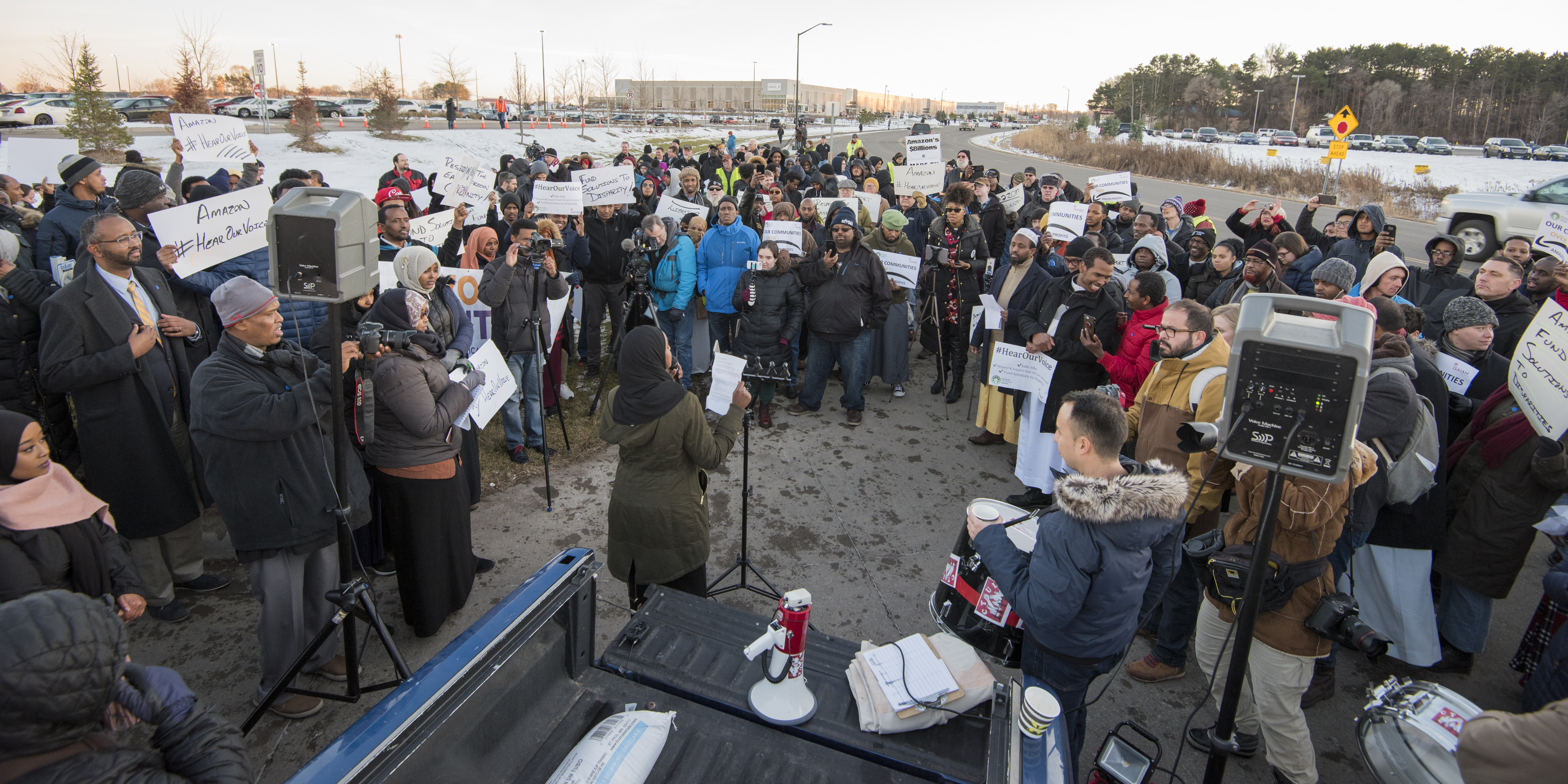
Amazon workers protest in Minnesota, 2018

In 2018, the thousand-plus Muslim and Somali migrant workforce at the Shakopee, Minnesota warehouse negotiated with Amazon for a lighter workload during the Ramadan fast, in the first negotiation between Amazon and its workers. They were supported by the Awood Center, a worker center backed by the Service Employee International Union.

When other businesses shut down during COVID-19 pandemic safety measures, the welfare and salary of workers ensuring the delivery of goods, including Amazon's labor, received renewed attention. Amazon workers, amid increased demand, advocated for pay increases and safety measures through work stoppage including walkouts and not appearing for work. Amazon increased pay for warehouse, transportation, delivery, and store workers and increased paid time off. Some workers described these concessions as a minimum for convincing employees to risk working during the pandemic. Amazon responded to worker activism by increasing anti-union propaganda, firing organizers, hiring Pinkertons, and surveilling its workers. In December 2020, the National Labor Relations Board found merit to a complaint that a Staten Island warehouse worker's firing was an illegal retaliation for organizing for pandemic safety procedure.

=== International Association of Machinists ===
Technical Amazon workers held the company's first unionization vote in the United States in January 2014, which failed 21 to 6. The NLRB held the vote following a December petition from International Association of Machinists and Aerospace Workers on behalf of 30 Amazon warehouse maintenance and repair workers in Middletown, Delaware.

In 2016, Amazon stopped a unionization drive in Chester, Virginia. Organizers were derided as "a cancer" to the workplace and some human resources officials were accused of tracking employee positions on the drive. The union filed a complaint and Amazon settled with the National Labor Relations Board, agreeing to post notices but not having to concede legal violations or fines. Most of the union supporters left.

=== Retail, Wholesale and Department Store Union ===
Video of President Joe Biden expressing support for unionization in Alabama, saying employers should use "no intimidation, no coercion, no threats, no anti-union propaganda."

Workers have leaked Amazon manager training videos about discouraging labor organization. In response to changes following Amazon's 2017 acquisition of grocery Whole Foods, workers began to organize as "Whole Worker".

The Retail, Wholesale and Department Store Union began to organize 2,500 workers from Amazon's Staten Island warehouse in December 2018, but this did not result in a union vote.

Amazon opened a fulfillment warehouse in Bessemer, Alabama, in March 2020. Within several months, Jennifer Bates, a warehouse worker at the facility, began leading workers in organizing to join the Retail, Wholesale and Department Store Union (RWDSU). Bessemer warehouse workers filed with the National Labor Relations Board (NLRB) in November to hold a unionization vote. The bargaining unit was originally proposed as 1,500 full-time and part-time employees. The workers, who are 85% Black, were inspired by the Black Lives Matter movement. Amazon fought the effort hard. The company retained anti-union lawyers Morgan, Lewis & Bockius, the same firm Amazon used to successfully fight the Delaware warehouse unionization effort in 2014. The NLRB denied the company's request to delay initial hearings. Amazon recommended expanding the bargaining unit to 5,700 workers, and in a three-day NLRB hearing, lawyers from Amazon and the union established a broader bargaining unit membership than originally proposed, including seasonal hires and on-site medical, safety, and training workers. These were common tactics to discourage unionization, as a larger bargaining unit would dilute the union's penetration, having only organized a portion of the originally proposed, smaller unit. The union accepted the expanded unit to let the vote proceed sooner. During the drive, Amazon held mandatory meetings to hear the company's anti-union position and hung signage to discourage unionization.

The union drive received outward support from American politicians including U.S. Representatives Andy Levin, Jamaal Bowman, Cori Bush, Terri Sewell, Nikema Williams and US Senator Bernie Sanders, among many others. President Joe Biden alluded to the Alabama drive in a contemporaneous speech in support of unions. Biden gave stronger support than any president has given unions in decades, and labor activists said his advocacy would build his support in the working class, fighting off Republican inroads there. During the drive, the RWDSU reported interest from a thousand Amazon workers across the United States.

Mail-in ballots were distributed on February 8, 2021, after the NLRB rejected Amazon's attempt to delay the vote. Ballots were due by March 29 to be counted on April 8 and 9. The vast majority voted against unionization: 1,798 to 738. Of about 6,000 eligible employees, about 40% had participated. An additional 505 ballots were contested and left sealed, not being numerous enough in count to sway the final tally.

The RWDSU filed unfair labor practice charges against Amazon before the NLRB, alleging that the company interfered in employees' right to "vote in a free and fair election". Their largest contention concerned potential worker intimidation based on the location of a ballot box. Amazon originally proposed on-site ballot boxes, which the NLRB rejected as giving the appearance that Amazon controlled the vote and potentially intimidating workers to not oppose the company's position. Instead, the United States Postal Service (USPS) approved a mailbox in the Bessemer warehouse's parking lot. Top-level management from Amazon and USPS were involved in the request, as Amazon strongly wanted employees to use this mailbox. After the USPS denied Amazon permission to add signage to the mailbox itself, Amazon built a tent around the mailbox to add its own signage calling attention to the mailbox as a place to vote. Amazon intended the tent to protect voter privacy, but the parent union held that the tent made the mail-in vote appear to be under company surveillance and control, rather than by the independent NLRB. Separately, a pro-union employee testified to having seen company security guards open the mailbox. Amazon said their access was limited to incoming mailboxes. RWDSU had known about the mailbox in advance of the vote and chose to proceed. Former NLRB chair Wilma B. Liebman said that the mailbox contention is "strong grounds for overturning the election". Several Postal Service employees testified that Amazon had not been provided keys to the mailbox.

In August 2021, an NLRB report on the Bessemer union drive found that "a free and fair election was impossible" and that "possibility that the employer's misconduct influenced some of these 2,000 eligible voters [who did not vote]."

On November 29, 2021, a regional director of the National Labor Relations Board ordered a re-vote. In March 2022, the warehouse voted for a second time, but the result was too close to call with more than 400 ballots being contested and 875-993 counted votes in favor of unionizing.

=== Amazonians United ===
In the first 12 months of the pandemic, 37 labor complaints were filed with the National Labor Relations Board (NLRB), more than triple the prior year and multiple cases involving labor organizers. One complaint concerned an employee who organized a walkout over pandemic working conditions in a Queens, New York, warehouse. The employee, Jonathan Bailey, a co-founder of Amazonians United, was interrogated and accused of harassment. The NLRB filed a federal complaint against Amazon after finding merit to the worker's claims of company retaliation for protected activities. In another case, the NLRB sided with a Pennsylvania warehouse worker who had lobbied for sick pay for part-time employees. She settled with Amazon and withdrew her complaint. The increase in cases reflects rising activism among Amazon warehouse workers. The warehouse worker firings led to public acts of solidarity from some Amazon corporate employees. Emily Cunningham and Maren Costa, both user experience designers, were fired for violating internal policies in April 2020, which the NLRB later determined had been unlawful resulting in a board settlement involving back pay and notice-posting around employees' right to organize. Tim Bray, a vice president of Amazon Web Services resigned in response based on the handling of their case.

=== Teamsters ===
==== Amazon Labor Union (2021–Present) ====
The Amazon Labor Union (ALU) is a labor union specifically for Amazon workers, created on April 20, 2021. On April 1, 2022, the Amazon workers at a warehouse in Staten Island, JFK8, backed by the ALU became the first unionized Amazon workers recognized by the National Labor Relations Board. In June 2024 the union became affiliated with Teamsters.

==== Delivery Service Partners ====
Amazon's 158,000 Delivery Service Partner (DSP) drivers are subcontracted across 2,500 companies spanning eight countries, such that Amazon can drop any one provider whose workers unionize. One DSP provider's Michigan office closed within a month of its workers voting to organize in 2017. Amazon supplies subcontracted companies with financing and surveillance technology to track driver movements in real time. The subcontracted companies, in turn, handle workplace management and liability, insulating Amazon. After the Michigan example, Amazon advised other DSP firms on how to avoid union drives, which proved successful through early 2021. The Bessemer union drive inspired a peer-organized poll of Amazon delivery drivers, in which the vast majority of its 500 respondents showed interest in unionizing.

Following the failed drive, the major labor union Teamsters resolved with near unanimity in their June 2021 Teamsters convention to organize Amazon warehouse and delivery workers as a central focus.

In April 2023, 84 drivers were voluntarily recognized by Battle Tested Strategies (BTS), a DPS contractor in Palmdale, California. Shortly after, on 28 April, they ratified their first collective bargaining agreement, which would raise their wages from $19.75 an hour to $30 in September. However, BTS's contract with Amazon expires in October. At stake is the question whether Amazon is a joint employer or not.

Teamsters-affiliated Amazon delivery drivers went on strike at nine locations across the United States during the 2024 holiday season.

=== Amazon Workers United (2022) ===
In 2022, an Amazon Fresh store in Seattle, Washington formed an independent union and declared themselves to be a union to their management. Amazon Workers United have not petitioned for recognition with the NLRB.

== Canada ==
In mid-2018, the United Food and Commercial Workers Union Canada filed a complaint against Amazon with the Ontario Labour Relations Board, accusing the company of having fired delivery drivers for attempting to launch a unionization drive.

In mid-September 2021, workers at an Amazon warehouse in Nisku, Alberta, filed for a unionization vote with the Alberta Labour Relations Board. A few days later, the Teamsters Union launched unionization drives in nine Amazon warehouses across Canada.

In 2022, a unionization process of the YUL2 warehouse in Montreal was launched. Amazon tried to resist the process and in February 2024 the union filed a complaint against Amazon at the Tribunal administratif du travail du Québec. The arbitrator found Amazon to be at fault in their methods. In April 2024, a union under the Confédération des syndicats nationaux (CSN) submitted an accreditation request to represent the employees of the DXT4 warehouse in Laval, Quebec. In May 2024, the DXT4 warehouse union received accreditation to represent the workers, making it the first Amazon union in Canada. In June of the same year, the union was ready to negotiate and its members were waiting for Amazon to respond to their request.

On January 22, 2025, Amazon announced the closure of all warehouses in the province of Quebec as of February 8, 2025. While the announcement maintained that the decision was a cost-saving measure unrelated the unionization of the DXT4 warehouse, other media received information that it was a factor. Following its decision to close the seven facilities, laying off more than 1,700 employees, Amazon said it would return to the subcontracted delivery model it used prior to 2020. Université de Montréal professor Mélanie Laroche stated that Quebec's labor laws, which require a collective bargaining agreement be negotiated and impose binding arbitration, are much more restrictive for businesses than laws in other provinces. After the announcement, minister of Innovation, Science and Industry François-Philippe Champagne stated that the decision was incompatible with valuing Canadian workers. Retail expert and researcher Jacques Nantel believes that Amazon's timing was "certainly not a coincidence" and supports a boycott. The action prompted comparisons to Walmart Canada's 2004 response to unionization as the company was fined at the time for violating the Quebec Labour Code. The legislation makes it illegal to retaliate against workers for unionizing by cutting their positions.

== Europe ==
Some Amazon warehouses in Europe are unionized, with strikes being most frequent in Germany, Italy, Poland, France and Spain. In May 2022, after 4 years of negotiations, 35 employee representatives across Europe and Amazon management established a European Works Council.

Amazon and other American technology companies with philosophies against organized labor are often scrutinized for operating counter to European norms. European criticism of Amazon's labor practices exceeds that of its practices in the United States. Members of the European Parliament have also criticized Amazon's treatment of European worker organizations. In 2021, the European Parliament asked Amazon CEO Jeff Bezos to testify on issues of workers' rights and unions. Amazon employed an intelligence team to monitor its European warehouse employees.

=== France ===
Inspired by the 2013 German strikes, 3 French trade unions CGT, FO and Solidaires (SUD) called for industrial strikes at the Saran Amazon location in June 2014.

In France during the COVID-19 pandemic, unions were involved in setting the terms of warehouse workers returning to work, including pandemic protections for workers, following a month-long dispute. Those who volunteered to return sooner, in a reduced capacity, received bonus pay and a reduced work day.

=== Germany ===
Germany is Amazon's largest market outside of the United States as of 2019. Amazon opened its first German logistics center in 1999 (FRA1) followed by FRA3 in 2009 in Bad Hersfeld. Hundreds of Amazon warehouse workers in Leipzig and Bad Hersfeld, organized with the trade union Ver.di, went on strike in 2013 over their worker classifications and salaries. Amazon subsequently improved overtime schedules, break rooms, and introduced Christmas bonuses. Amazon confirmed it would be opening three logistics centers in Poland.

Workers in multiple Amazon warehouses went on strike for better pay and working conditions during the company's June 2021 Prime Day.

Amazon uses support for works councils at its facilities, in part to negate the need for trade unions or collective bargaining. By promoting pro-management candidates in works council elections, Amazon is able to weaken trade union influence. Amazon legally structures each of its facilities as a separate legal entity so that regular local works councils can be established, but they are not part of a common legal entity, so no central works council can be established. Furthermore, because its European headquarters are located outside of Germany (in Belgium and Luxembourg), the group of German Amazon legal entities is also not eligible for representation by a group works council.

=== Italy ===
Amazon opened its first Fulfillment Center in Piacenza, Italy in 2011. The first two industrial strikes happened later in 2017, which resulted in collective bargaining with Amazon management. One year later, the May 2018 collective bargaining agreement between Amazon and the Italian Federation of Commerce, Hotel and Service Workers (Filcams CGIL) trade union, with 70% of voters in favor, was the company's first collective agreement anywhere in the world.

On March 22, 2021, Amazon workers across the supply chain organized the first nationwide strike in Amazon's history, including warehouse, logistics and subcontracted delivery workers.

=== Poland ===
Amazon opened its first logistics centers near the Polish cities Poznań and Wrocław in September 2014. While operating in Poland, they primarily serve foreign markets, notably Germany. There are two trade unions involved in organizing Amazon workers. The more militant union Inicjatywa Pracownicza (Workers' Initiative) is active in Poznań. Workers' Initiative is criticized by the mainstream Polish union Solidarność (affiliated to UNI Global Union) as being 'too radical'. During a strike in Germany in 2015, orders shifted and increased in Poland due to its geographic proximity. Several dozen workers in Poznań facility engaged in a work slowdown. Shortly afterwards, Amazon increased the hourly wage from 14 złoty to 15 złoty.

=== Turkey ===
Amazon contractors of CEVA Logistics went on strike in Kocaeli, Turkey in June 2022 as part of the independent union DGD-Sen, and again in August 2022.

=== United Kingdom ===
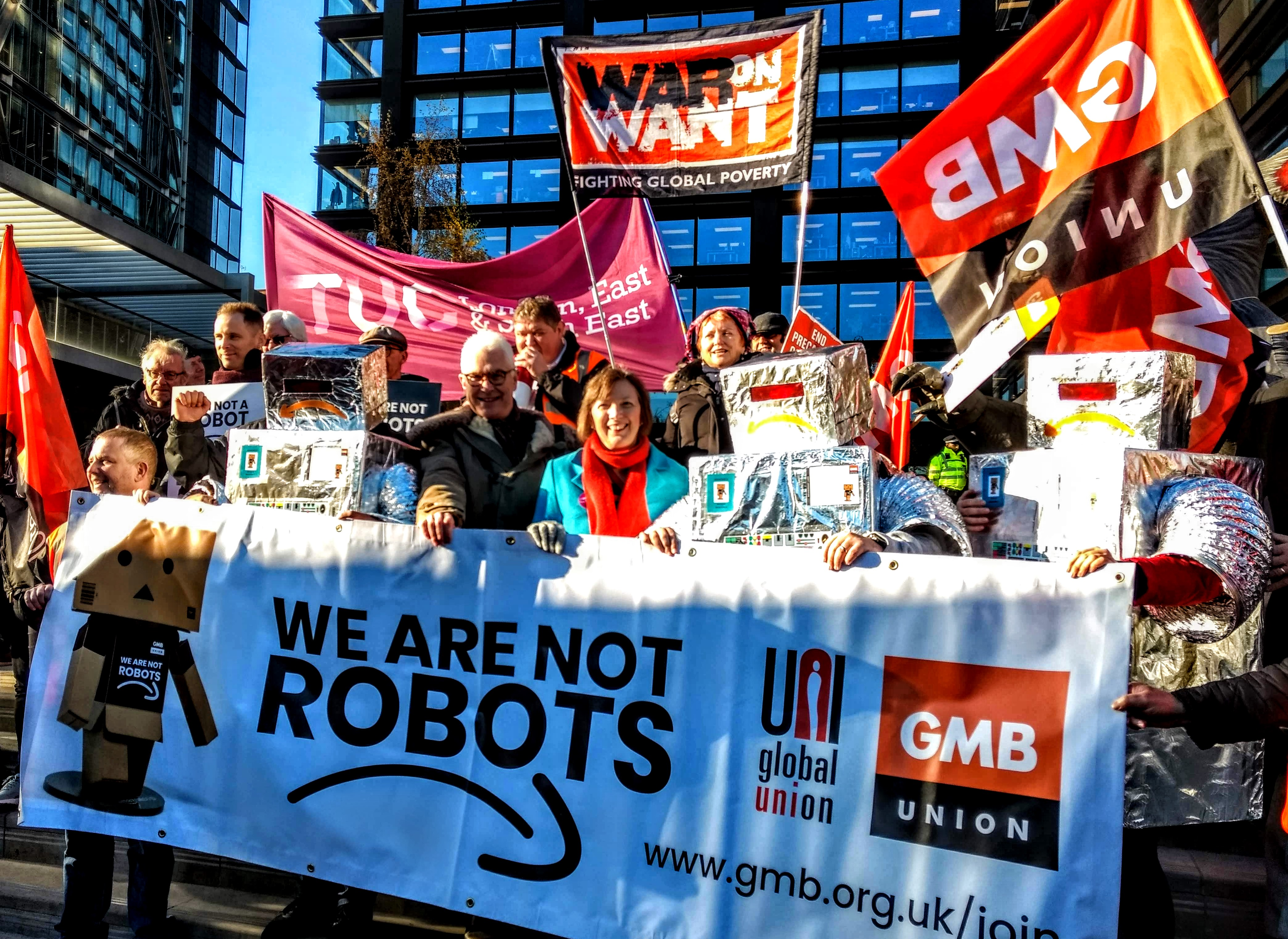
Cyber Monday protest organized by GMB outside Amazon's London HQ in 2019.

Amazon arrived in the UK in 1998. It is the 2nd largest market in Europe after Germany. In 2001, 80% of workers at the Milton Keynes Fulfillment Center (STN8) voted against unionizing with Graphical, Paper and Media Union (GPMU, now part of Unite the Union), which the union partly blames on union busting. Amazon.co.uk hired a US union busting consultancy organization The Burke Group to assist in defeating the union campaign. GPMU alleged that the company victimized or sacked four union members during the 2001 recognition drive and held a series of captive meetings with employees.

Since 2020, GMB is the main union responsible for organizing Amazon warehouse workers in the UK. There was a worker walkout in a Tilbury fulfillment center in 2022 over compensation, as British workers face increased cost-of-living expenses.

== Japan ==
Amazon Japan arrived in 2000 retains a quarter of the Japanese e-commerce market as of 2021. In Japan, a minimum of only two employees is sufficient to form a union. Some Amazon employees joined the Tokyo Managers Union (Japanese: 東京管理職ユニオン, romanized: Tokyo Kanrishoku Union) in 2015. Dozens more have joined since, representing a minority of the thousands of corporate Amazon employees.

== Climate change ==
Amazon employees have led tech worker activism on environmental issues.

For the company's 2019 annual general meeting (AGM), 28 Amazon employees filed a shareholder proposal asking the company to create a climate change plan; over 7,500 Amazon workers signed a letter in support of the proposals. Shareholders voted it down. In advance of a September 2019 tech industry walkout to protest inaction towards climate change, over 1,500 Amazon employees called for the company to commit to achieve zero emissions by 2030, among other asks. The day before the walkout, Amazon made a climate pledge which included being carbon neutral by 2040.

In response to reports in January 2020 that Amazon was threatening to fire some Amazon Employees for Climate Justice organizers for speaking publicly about the company's climate record, over 400 employees violated the communications policy in support of their colleagues. However, two of the organizers were fired in April 2020 for sharing a petition related to COVID-19 risks faced by warehouse workers. The National Labor Relations Board (NLRB) found that these firings were illegal and retaliatory.

Amazon workers again filed a shareholder proposal at the company's 2021 AGM asking the company to report on how pollution associated with its activities impacted communities of color. The company successfully petitioned the Securities and Exchange Commission (SEC) to exclude the proposal from going to a shareholder vote. In response, over 600 employees signed a letter calling on the company to bring forward its net zero pledge to 2030, and to prioritize deploying zero emissions technologies in communities most impacted by its pollution.

== Union busting by Amazon ==
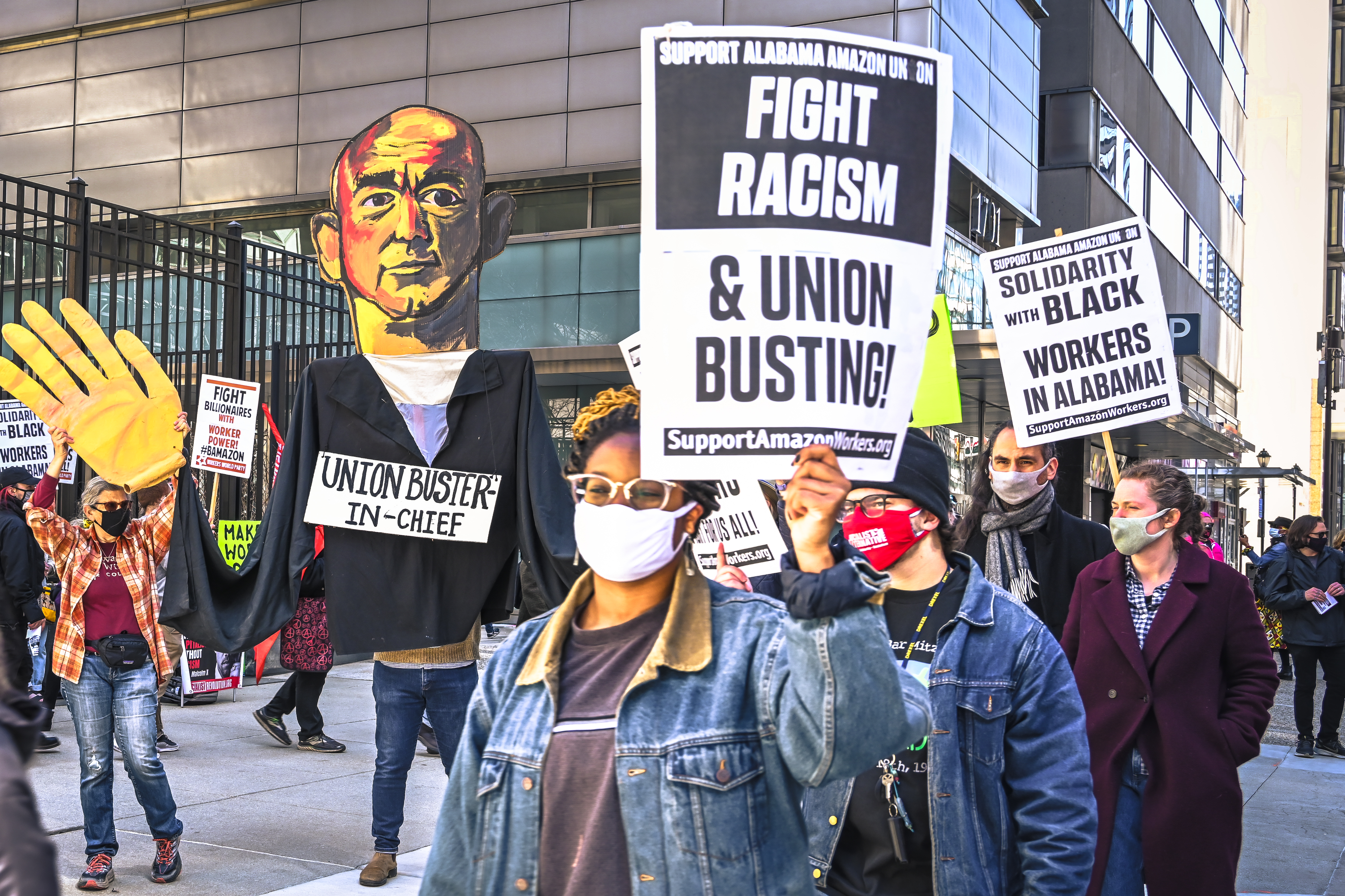
International Day of Solidarity With Alabama Amazon Workers, Philadelphia PA

Amazon has opposed efforts by workers to organize in trade unions in both the United States and the United Kingdom, and has actively engaged in union busting. Unite the Union has stated that Amazon workers "are not currently free to join a union without fear and without obstruction and propaganda being deployed against them." In September 2020, 37 European trade unions co-signed an open letter calling for the European Commission to investigate Amazon, saying the company "has led the raid on workers' rights, using its data-monopoly power to crush efforts by workers to improve their conditions. Now it is ramping up its espionage operations". Alessandro Delfanti of the University of Toronto has said that "something all Amazon workplaces have in common is the corporation's resistance to workplace democracy," pointing to the company's extremely high turnover rate, mass surveillance of workers, and accusations of firing workers attempting to lead unionization drives. In late-2020, Motherboard reported that Amazon monitored environmental and social justice groups, and that:

"Internal emails sent to Amazon's Global Security Operations Center obtained by Motherboard reveal that all the division's team members around the world receive updates on labor organizing activities at warehouses that include the exact date, time, location, the source who reported the action, the number of participants at an event (and in some cases a turnout rate of those expected to participate in a labor action), and a description of what happened, such as a "strike" or "the distribution of leaflets." Other documents reveal that Amazon intelligence analysts keep close tabs on how many warehouse workers attend union meetings; specific worker dissatisfaction with warehouse conditions, such as excessive workloads; and cases of warehouse-worker theft, from a bottle of tequila to $15,000 worth of smart watches".

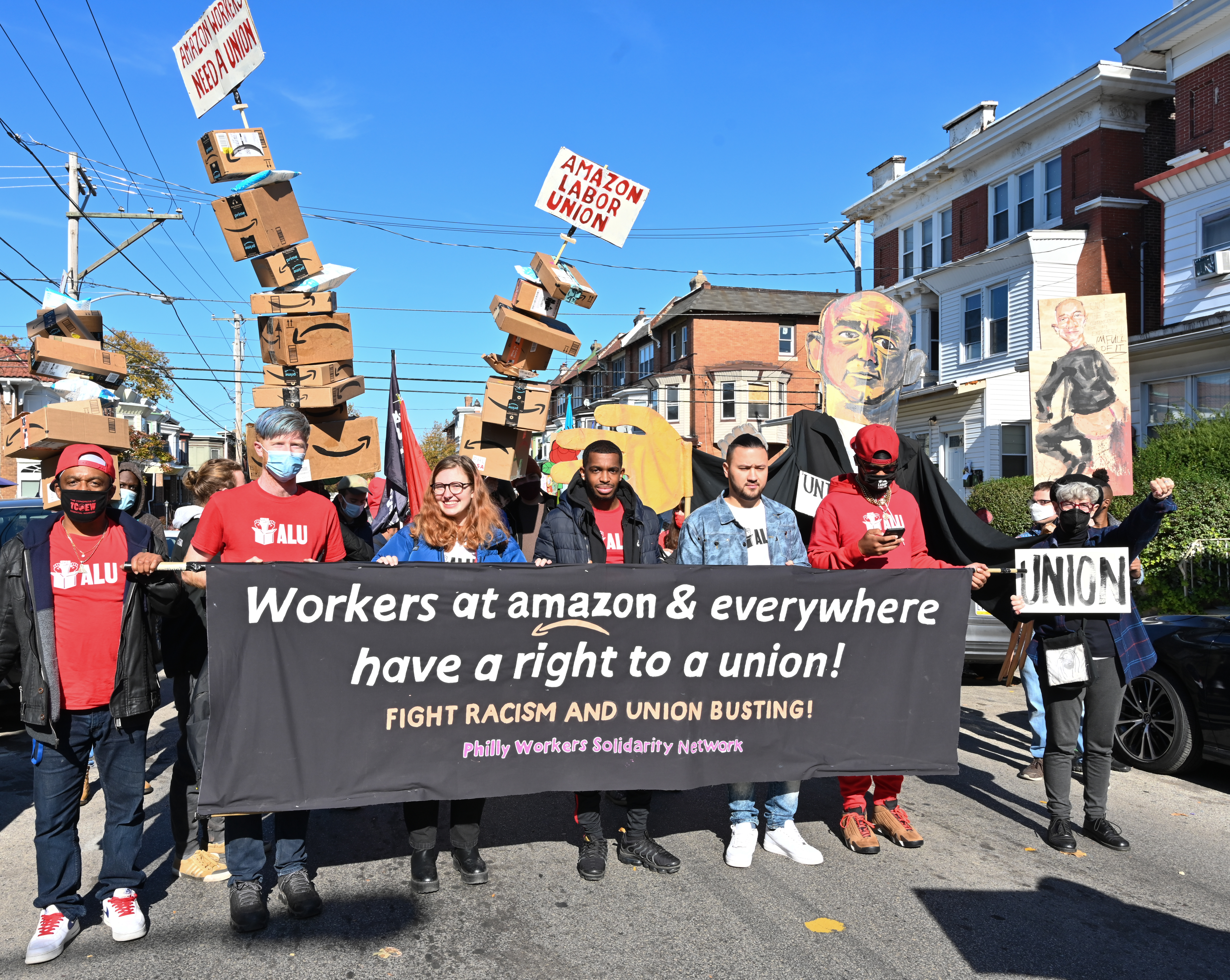
Organize Amazon Workers contingent in the Peoplehood Parade Philadelphia, PA

Amazon has also hired anti-union organizations to help stop unionization drives and private detective agencies such as Pinkerton to infiltrate its warehouses. The company has also run social media campaigns using fake accounts to spread anti-union messaging. Amazon forced employees to attend captive audience meetings that contained anti-union messages.

An Amazon training video that was leaked in 2018 stated "We are not anti-union, but we are not neutral either. We do not believe unions are in the best interest of our customers or shareholders or most importantly, our associates". Two years later, it was found that Whole Foods was using a heat map to track which of its 510 stores had the highest levels of pro-union sentiment. Factors including racial diversity, proximity to other unions, poverty levels in the surrounding community and calls to the National Labor Relations Board were named as contributors to "unionization risk". Data collected in the heat map suggest that stores with low racial and ethnic diversity, especially those located in poor communities, are more likely to unionize. Amazon also had a job listing for an Intelligence Analyst, whose role it would be to identify and tackle threats to Amazon, which included unions and organized labor.

- Canales, Katie (February 9, 2021). "Amazon's own investors are reportedly telling the company to stop pressuring warehouse workers who have begun to vote on forming the firm's first union". Business Insider. Archived from the original on February 24, 2021.
- Coldewey, Devin (March 24, 2020). "Amazon warehouse workers organized to demand PTO, and coronavirus clinched it". TechCrunch. Archived from the original on May 8, 2020.
- Cox, Kate (September 2, 2020). "Amazon deletes anti-union listing, watches workers' 'secret' social groups". Ars Technica. Archived from the original on September 26, 2020.
- Dickey, Megan Rose (April 30, 2020). "Amazon worker-activists form international organization to demand change in warehouses". TechCrunch. Archived from the original on May 12, 2020.
- Galiz-Rowe, Ty (September 2, 2020). "Amazon Has Deleted Job Listing For Union-Busting Roles". GameSpot. Archived from the original on September 3, 2020.
- Ghaffary, Shirin (May 1, 2020). "The May Day strike from Amazon, Instacart, and Target workers didn't stop business. It was still a success". Vox. Archived from the original on May 3, 2020.
- Greene, Jay (February 2, 2021). "Amazon's anti-union blitz stalks Alabama warehouse workers everywhere, even the bathroom". Washington Post. ISSN 0190-8286. Archived from the original on February 28, 2021.
- Gurley, Lauren Kaori (November 23, 2020). "Secret Amazon Reports Expose Company Spying on Labor, Environmental Groups". Vice. Archived from the original on November 23, 2020.
- Heater, Brian; Dickey, Megan Rose (February 7, 2021). "Amazon warehouse workers to begin historic vote to unionize". TechCrunch. Archived from the original on November 14, 2021.
- Herrera, Sebastian (January 31, 2021). "Amazon Faces Familiar Opponent in Alabama Union Election". Wall Street Journal. ISSN 0099-9660. Archived from the original on February 24, 2021.
- Kopytoff, Verne (January 16, 2014). "How Amazon Crushed the Union Movement". Time. Archived from the original on May 23, 2020.
- Lyons, Kim (May 4, 2020). "Amazon VP quits over whistleblower firings in scathing blog post". The Verge. Archived from the original on May 4, 2020.
- Matsakis, Louise (April 24, 2020). "Amazon Sick-Out Unites Tech and Warehouse Workers in Protest". Wired. ISSN 1059-1028. Archived from the original on May 30, 2020.
- Newton, Casey (April 24, 2020). "Amazon's white-collar workers are starting to stand up for their blue-collar colleagues". The Verge. Archived from the original on April 24, 2020.
- Nickelsburg, Monica (September 4, 2020). "Amazon has avoided unions for 25 years — here's why labor leaders think that could soon change". GeekWire. Archived from the original on November 1, 2020.
- Rey, Jason Del (October 6, 2020). "Leaked: Confidential Amazon memo reveals new software to track unions". Vox. Archived from the original on October 11, 2020.
- Sainato, Michael (February 3, 2021). "Amazon intensifies 'severe' effort to discourage first-ever US warehouse union". The Guardian. Archived from the original on February 22, 2021.
- Streitfeld, David (March 16, 2021). "How Amazon Crushes Unions". The New York Times. ISSN 0362-4331. Archived from the original on March 21, 2021.
- Tarnoff, Ben (May 4, 2020). "The Making of the Tech Worker Movement". Logic Magazine. Archived from the original on August 18, 2020.
- Weigel, Moira (December 20, 2020). "Inside the Whale: An Interview with an Anonymous Amazonian". Logic Magazine. Archived from the original on January 2, 2021.
