= Emma Kinema =

American labor organizer

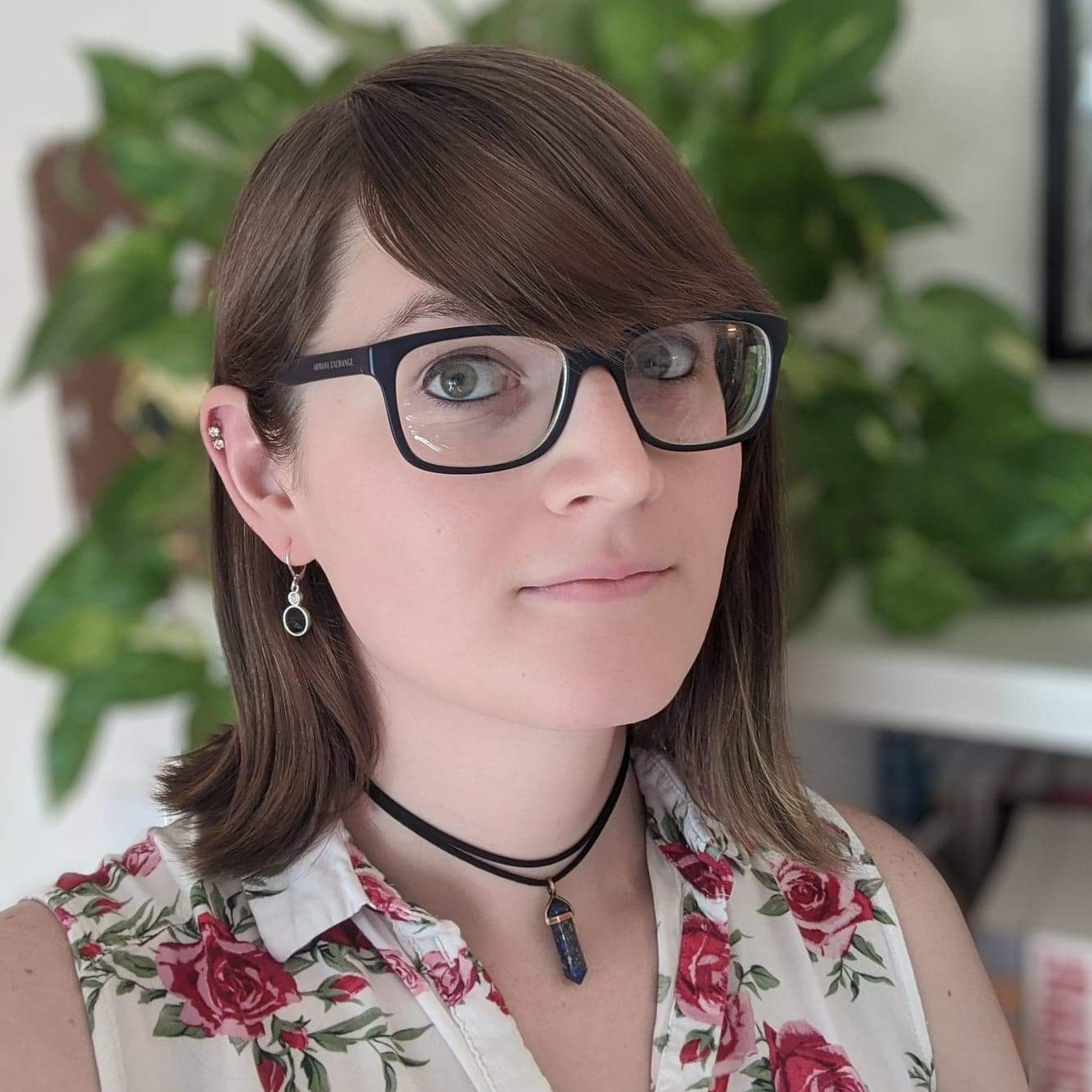
- Occupation: Labor organizer
- Known for: CODE-CWA; Alphabet Workers Union; Game Workers Unite

Emma Kinema is an American labor organizer and the senior campaign lead of CODE-CWA, the Communications Workers of America's project to unionize tech and video game workers. She was hired by the CWA union in 2020 to lead their initiative to organize video game and tech workers, the first American initiative of its kind in those sectors.

As of 2026 CODE-CWA was known to have organized over 7,000 tech workers into CWA since its launch, with notable CWA tech union wins including Microsoft, Alphabet, New York Times, Wikimedia Foundation, University of California system, and more.

== Career ==
Emma Kinema's career background in the tech industry and video game industry has spanned a variety of roles across multiple types and sizes of companies. She had also been involved in labor organizing since the early 2010s, she had previously trained with the Industrial Workers of the World, and she has been involved in cross-union collaboration efforts and organizer education. Kinema has participated in other grassroots movement organizing.

=== CODE-CWA ===
Following two years of discussions, in January 2020, Communications Workers of America hired Kinema to organize workers in the video game and tech industries which led to the Campaign to Organize Digital Employees (CODE-CWA), the first American union initiative in those sectors. When the project launched in 2020, she said she planned to use the Communications Workers of America's infrastructure to fight issues including crunch time, layoffs, and workplace ethics, which she has construed as working conditions for employees who choose employers based on their ability to impact society.

Kinema was personally involved in the founding of the Alphabet Workers Union, helped organize the first successful video game strike, helped certify the first North American video game studio bargaining unit, helped found the United Videogame Workers, was involved in the unionization of over 4,000 workers at Microsoft by CWA, and more.

=== Game Workers Unite ===
By the late 2010s, those interests coincided for her as a labor organizer in the games industry when Kinema volunteered as a games industry organizer and co-founder of Game Workers Unite, a group of volunteers organizing the video games industry. This volunteering, which she estimated as 60 hours per week, included giving and receiving training and was at one point supported by crowdfunded monthly income. Kinema's interest in organizing the game industry was propelled by her first- and secondhand experiences with crunch time (long periods of overtime), toxic workplace culture, and issues related to layoffs, pay gaps, discrimination, health care, and artistic credit attribution.

External videos
- Presentation at XOXO, 2019

Kinema helped to organize a panel on labor at the March 2019 Game Developers' Conference and in May, helped to organize the walkout at Riot Games over its handling of sex discrimination. She assisted Riot workers in creating an organizing committee after they attended a 2018 Game Workers Unite meeting and further advised the organizers via phone. Variety named the Game Workers Unite organizers and Kinema (as the group's most public figure) among the most influential people in video games in 2018.

== Organizing analysis ==
=== Organizing with political and historical analysis ===
In conversation with labor journalist Sarah Jaffe, Kinema highlighted "the socialists and communists behind the CIO and its predecessor organizations" as a great examples of how generating good organizing tactics requires "a political and historical analysis of the state of things, and being able to apply our tactics based off that analysis." This method of analysis is what led her to being involved in organizing the tech industry saying "there's a deep, strategic importance to organizing in technology because our modern tech industry is at the heart of every other industry. You can't have a global logistics infrastructure without the software that enables it. You can't have automated manufacturing on a global scale without the technology that does it. Understanding that structural position of tech, that leverage that comes from the structural position we have, [and] where we exist in the context of the global economy is essential."

=== Tying social and economic issues together ===
Kinema believes that to build unity among the working class, organizers don't win by downplaying social and demographic differences between workers, but instead by diving "fully into those struggles that most center [workers of color, LGBTQ+ workers, and immigrants] and [building] up the organizers who are coming out of those natural fights." When asked about how to organize new industries with little union history, Kinema has said that while organizing smaller groups of workers is an imperfect solution to the big picture of organizing, workers earning any semblance of power is a crucial first step from which the workforce can build on. She has also said that she believes organizing in the tech industry, and organizing the unorganized in general, is essential for improving the labor movement overall.

=== Education is key to organizing ===
On the question of companies' efforts to oppose unionization, Kinema has said "[workers are] entering a new phase in organizing... It's not worth fighting the arc of history... this industry will be organized, one way or another." Kinema has described the video game industry's conditions as having the worst characteristics of the tech and media industries. Kinema believes the biggest obstacle to widespread new organizing in tech and games isn't logistics or resources, but instead a question of education, ideology, and changing culture.

=== Direct join unionism (also known as pre-majority) ===
Kinema has regularly been involved with and led direct join style union campaigns with CWA in tech and games. She contributed an essay to the founding zine of the United Videogame Workers union providing the rationale for the new union's structure and articulating how direct join organizing provides an alternative to reliance on traditional labor law procedures for building power. Founding members of the direct join Alphabet Workers Union specifically stated Kinema's experience cofounding the Game Workers Unite movement outside of traditional certification structures as a reason for why Google workers in North America chose to organize with CWA.

On the relationship between direct join and certification union models Kinema has said "we think they can complement each other, actually, and expand upon each other." She has regularly argued that worker organizations do not derive their legitimacy solely from government certification or legal recognition and once said "I would simply describe The Alphabet Workers Union as a union, because that's what they are."

The Industrial Workers of the World union, which Kinema was involved with for many years, puts a heavy emphasis on organizing outside of typical labor law certification and bargaining frameworks.

== Personal life ==
Her name is a pseudonym chosen so that she could continue working in the games industry without risking dismissal or reprisal under at-will employment. She described undergoing "pretty extreme lengths" to separate her full-time career from her work as an organizer.

Kinema, a queer, trans woman, has spoken about the power of unionization to connect economic rights and social justice. In 2023, Fast Company placed Kinema on their 50 LGBTQ Women and Nonbinary Leaders list for her organizing work.

== See also ==
- CODE-CWA
- Alphabet Workers Union
- Unionization in the tech sector
- Communications Workers of America
- Claire Stapleton
- Liz Fong-Jones
- Jaz Brisack
- Cher Scarlett
- Jessica Gonzalez
