= Claire Stapleton =

American writer and marketer

- Born: 1985 or 1986 (age 40–41); Berkeley, California, U.S
- Education: University of Pennsylvania (BA)
- Occupations: Writer, marketer
- Known for: Workplace activism
- Notable work: 2018 Google walkouts
- Children: 2

Claire Stapleton (born 1985) is an American writer and marketer known for her involvement in the 2018 Google Walkout for Real Change. She is the author of the newsletter Tech Support.

== Education ==
Stapleton earned a Bachelor of Arts degree in English from the University of Pennsylvania.

== Career and activism ==
=== Google (2007-2019) ===
Stapleton began working for Google in 2007, after briefly considering a role with Teach For America, working on the internal communications team at their Mountain View, California campus.

During her communications work, Stapleton helped produce the company's weekly all-hands meeting, known as TGIF, hosted by founders Larry Page and Sergey Brin. She was also responsible for writing the company's talking points in weekly emails to employees. At her final TGIF in Mountain View in 2012, Page called Stapleton on stage and presented her with a wooden plaque that dubbed her "The Bard of Google".

Later, Stapleton joined YouTube's team as a marketing manager in New York City.

On November 1, 2018, Stapleton, along with 20,000 Google workers across 50 cities, walked off the job in protest of Google's contracts with The Pentagon such as Project Maven, Project Dragonfly, and Project JEDI, and the company's handling of sexual harassment allegations, including a $90 million exit package for Andy Rubin, who allegedly coerced a junior employee into sexual contact. Rubin referred to the report as a "wild exaggeration", and denies any misconduct. The employees, led by Stapleton, former Google Artificial Intelligence researcher Meredith Whittaker, and five others, also put together a list of demands for change, including addressing what they alleged was rampant sexism and racism, getting rid of mandatory arbitration, and better pay for contractors. According to Stapleton, the events themselves were not the catalyst of their strike, but rather the TGIF that followed the news of Rubin's resignation, which she said was dismissive and ignored the report about payouts to male executives accused of sexual misconduct, though CEO Sundar Pichai and Page both reportedly apologized. Pichai also said that 48 employees had been terminated after investigations into harassment over the previous two years, none of whom received an exit package. Stapleton said the meeting sparked her to start an email list for women at the company, which she said quickly grew to more than 1,500 members.

In the days following the walkout, Google responded in support, Pichai saying in a memo to employees, "I take this responsibility very seriously and I’m committed to making the changes we need to improve". The memo also announced concession to some of the demands, including ending forced arbitration in cases of sexual assault and sexual harassment and overhaul the process for reporting sexual misconduct. Stapleton and the other leaders acknowledged the progress in a note posted on the Google Walkout Medium account, but criticized leadership saying they, "troublingly erased [the demands] focused on racism, discrimination, and ... structural inequity", and for ignoring the request to elevate the diversity officer to the board. When asked who should be leading addressing the remaining demands, Stapleton said, "Larry and Sergey, where are they?"

In January 2019, Stapleton said she was demoted as part of a restructuring she said was vaguely communicated, losing half of her direct reports. She also said her work was reassigned to others and that her manager ignored her, and she was pushed to resign. When Stapleton attempted to press human resources about the changes to her role and her work being delegated to other people, she said that the company advised her to go on medical leave, even though she wasn't ill. Stapleton hired an attorney, prompting a re-investigation into the demotion, and said that it was "walked back ... at least on paper."

In April 2019, Stapleton and Whittaker alleged their managers had retaliated against them for their participation in organizing the walkout, a claim that Google denied. Google claimed that Stapleton's allegations of retaliation were unsubstantiated because Google had given her the team's Culture Award for her role in the walkout. Stapleton, Whittaker, and others who had led the Google Walkout promoted a social media campaign under the hashtag #NotOkGoogle to gather additional stories of alleged retaliation, and shared their experiences of alleged retaliation on Medium. They said company had a culture of retaliation that disproportionately affected marginalized and underrepresented groups. While the campaign gained fast momentum, Google announced they had created a new website for employees to report misconduct.

On April 26, 2019, Stapleton and Whittaker held a "Retaliation Town Hall" that was livestreamed to Google offices. Attendees reported that Stapleton shared emails she said were sent from the executives to thousands of her coworkers disputing that she had been demoted. While Google has maintained that it does not tolerate retaliation, employees who attended the town hall shared stories of their own alleged retaliation, and organized a sit-in protest on May 1, 2019 in response. Some employees took a sick day while staying at the office in honor of Stapleton's claim that she was urged to take medical leave when she said she was not sick. Later, additional employees with public resignations also alleged retaliation due to what they believed was their involvement in organizing.

On May 31, 2019, while pregnant with her second child, Stapleton resigned from the company in exchange for severance. A note she shared internally was published by the Google Walkout Medium account the following week, which gained media attention. In the note, Stapleton described how her perspective of the company shifted over her tenure from pride and inspiration until 2017, when she returned from maternity leave with her first child and felt the company had "lost its moral compass." She described her decision to quit saying, “If I stayed, I didn’t just worry that there’d be more public flogging, shunning, and stress, I expected it.” Stapleton said she was physically escorted off of the premises by security, who also confiscated her company devices, she also said this was unconventional for departing workers. Stapleton later warned potential Big Tech candidates to be wary of buying into the idea of changing the world from the inside saying, "...if you care about a company’s values, ethics and contributions to society, you should take your talents elsewhere."

In an essay for Elle in December 2019, Stapleton said that she became intimately familiar with how hostile Google's "famously open culture" was to outspoken workers, and that it was evidence of the lengths the company's leadership was willing to go to prevent staffers from holding the company accountable. She also pointed out the façade of support around the walkout from Pichai and CFO Ruth Porat, who petitioned the National Labor Relations Board to limit protections for workers organizing via email a few days after the walkout.

=== 2020 ===
In May 2020, Stapleton started a newsletter for her agitated peers in tech called Tech Support, meant to offer guidance for other tech workers from her experiences over her 12 years at Google.

=== 2026 ===
In 2026, Stapleton published a book about her experiences working at Google titled, Don't Be Evil: Bad Bosses, Fake Promises, and My Escape from Big Tech. The New Yorker published a Weekend Essay (July 18, 2026) written by Stapleton concerning her Google experience entitled, "The Voice of Google."

== Personal life ==
Stapleton was born in Berkeley, California. She has two children.

== Works ==
- Stapleton, Claire (2026). Don't Be Evil: Bad Bosses, Fake Promises, and My Escape from Big Tech. New York, NY William Morrow. ISBN 978-0-06-346514-5.

== See also ==
- Timnit Gebru
- Sophie Zhang
- Frances Haugen
- Chelsey Glasson
- Google and trade unions
- Alphabet Workers Union
