= Obi Felten =

Obi Felten is a German technology executive and entrepreneur, best known for her leadership roles at Google and X, the Moonshot Factory, and for founding the mental health technology company Flourish Labs. Throughout her career, Felten has been recognized for her contributions in business and technology in Germany and internationally.

== Early life and education ==
Felten was born and raised in Berlin-Dahlem, Germany. Her father is a professor of medieval history, and her mother is a teacher. She studied philosophy and experimental psychology at the University of Oxford.

== Career ==
After completing her studies, Felten began her career as a consultant in London and later joined EToys, one of the first online toy mail-order companies.

=== Google and X ===
Felten joined Google in 2006 as Head of Consumer Marketing for the United Kingdom. In 2009, she was promoted to Director of Consumer Marketing for Europe, the Middle East, and Africa (EMEA). She was ranked fourth in Marketing's Power 100 list in 2012 for her impact on the company's brand and consumer strategy. Later that year, she transitioned to Google X (now known as X Development or simply X, the Moonshot Factory), Alphabet's research and development lab based in Mountain View, California, after a conversation with Astro Teller. At X, Felten served as Head of Getting Moonshots Ready for Contact with the Real World, a role she described at WIRED 2014 as helping bridge the gap between technical innovation and practical application. Her work at Google and X included several major projects:

- Project Loon, a high-altitude balloon system designed to extend internet access globally; it was used to restore connectivity in Puerto Rico after Hurricane Maria and later launched commercially in Kenya.
- Waymo, Google's self-driving car project.
- Project Amber, which applied brain-based biomarkers and machine learning to measure and understand anxiety and depression.
- The Foundry, an incubator division that developed business models around early-stage scientific breakthroughs.

Felten also participated in the 2018 Google walkouts following reports of mishandled sexual harassment allegations at the company. She left Google in June 2021.

=== Flourish Labs ===
In 2021, Felten founded Flourish Labs, a telehealth company that uses technology to mobilize and scale professional peer support to address the youth mental health crisis. In 2023, the company raised US$6.6 million in seed funding to expand its platform.

=== Advisory work ===
Felten joined the board of directors of Marathon Health in 2022 and serves on the supervisory board of Springer Nature.

== Awards and recognition ==
Felten has received multiple honors, including:

- German Innovation Prize "Future Thinker" (2018)
- Financial Times Woman Changemaker (2018)
- Manager Magazin / BCG Top 100 Most Influential Women in German Business (2019 and 2020)
- Global Biz Outlook Top Women in Tech to Watch 2025

== Personal life ==
Felten lives in California. She is married and has two children.
