= CODE-CWA =

Initiative to unionize tech and video game workers

- Campaign to Organize Digital Employees
- Founded: 2020
- Key people: Emma Kinema
- Affiliations: Communications Workers of America
- Website: code-cwa.org

The Campaign to Organize Digital Employees (CODE-CWA) is a project by the Communications Workers of America to unionize tech and video game workers in January 2020 As of 2026 CODE-CWA was known to have organized over 7,000 tech workers into CWA since its launch.

CODE-CWA campaigns have been launched at a range of workplaces such as major multinational tech companies, non-profits, public sector employers, startups, video game studios, media companies, and worker co-operatives.

Notable CWA union wins include Microsoft, Alphabet, New York Times, Wikimedia Foundation, University of California system, and more.

== Campaign Development and Achievements ==
The idea for the CODE-CWA campaign to organize the tech industry emerged from conversations between CWA leaders with North American activists in Game Workers Unite (GWU).

The campaign was launched publicly in early 2020 and their first bargaining units were certified at the tech startup Glitch and Blue State Digital. Later that year they also organized the first successful strike in the game industry at Voltage Entertainment, which lasted for 21 days and resulted in pay increases and improved transparency.

In 2021, CODE-CWA won multiple bargaining unit certifications, assisted with organizing protests at Activision Blizzard over sexual harassment and abuse, and helped found the Alphabet Workers Union. CWA also certified the first video game studio union in North America and certified a union at the notable progressive tech company EveryAction which became the "largest progressive tech union with majority traditional tech workers in the United States."

As of 2022, CODE-CWA had organized over 3000 union members in various sub-industries of the tech sector across over 25 bargaining units. CWA had also established a labor neutrality agreement with Microsoft which would later lead to thousands of workers winning union certifications.

In 2023, workers at SEGA of America won union representation with CWA and around 400 workers at Microsoft-owned ZeniMax certified their unions. In the same year ZeniMax workers reached a tentative agreement with Microsoft on AI, the first collectively bargained AI protections in the U.S. tech industry.

In 2024, over 600 tech workers represented by CWA at the New York Times went on strike and won their first union contract. SEGA of America workers won their first union contract, and over 1,000 workers at Microsoft successfully unionized.

In 2025, CWA launched the United Videogame Workers videogame industry-wide direct-join union at the Game Developers Conference. ZeniMax workers became the first Microsoft workforce in North America to have a ratified union agreement.More than 1,000 additional workers at Microsoft won certified unions with CWA, including the cinematics and VFX team at Blizzard Entertainment. Around 3,000 Microsoft workers alone were unionized with CWA by August 2025.

As of 2026 CODE-CWA had organized at least over 7,000 tech workers into CWA since its launch, and around 4,000 at Microsoft. In May 2026, over 2,000 tech and IT workers at the University of California school system won their union certification to join CWA. In September 2026, the USA based Wikimedia Foundation workers successfully won union certification with CWA. In November 2026, workers from the Internet Archive announced their campaign to form a union with the CWA. 80 of the 124 US-based employees voted in favor of unionizing and are awaiting voluntary recognition.

== Organizing Strategies and Methods ==
CWA campaigns in the tech industry have used a wide range of models, structures, tactics, and approaches to organizing depending on the workplace, employer, industry, and legal environment. Various techniques are also often framed as alternatives or mutually exclusive, but are shown being used side-by-side in CWA's efforts. This fits a larger pattern of CWA approaching organizing in different contexts with a wide array of creative tactics and strategies more broadly.

=== Direct Join Unionism (also known as Pre-Majority) ===
Direct Join (or Pre-majority, minority unionism) has been used as a method to create permanent dues-funded union structure without first winning formal recognition and making change through direction action, education, and community building as seen on an industry scale with United Videogame Workers or across the subsidiary and vendor companies of a major tech employer like Alphabet with the Alphabet Workers Union.

Direct join organizing has also been combined with bargaining unit certification efforts to win expanded rights within the context of broader campaigns as with multiple units at Alphabet and Google.

CODE-CWA senior campaign lead Emma Kinema contributed an essay to the founding zine of the United Videogame Workers union providing the rationale for the new union's structure and articulating how direct join organizing provides an alternative to reliance on traditional labor law procedures for building power. Founding members of the direct join Alphabet Workers Union specifically stated Kinema's experience cofounding the Game Workers Unite movement outside of traditional certification structures as a reason for why Google workers in North America chose to organize with CWA.

=== Certification Strategies ===
Voluntary recognition has been won in several CODE-CWA campaigns as a means of avoiding the drawn out National Labor Relations Board union certification process.

CWA also won a labor neutrality agreement with Microsoft which created alternative recognition procedures, allowed organizers to meet with workers on company property, and led to over 4,000 workers unionizing in a couple years.

CWA also has done public-sector organizing and bargaining-unit expansion for tech and IT workers, particularly at the University of California.

=== Methods for Pressuring Employers ===
Tech workers unionized with CWA have also leveraged strategic strikes that target critical operations chokepoints, like at the New York Times during an election-week.

CWA members in tech and games have also engaged in public mobilizations beyond specific bargaining unit boundaries, like protests at the Game Awards.

== Notable Organizers ==
The CODE-CWA campaign has involved members, elected leadership, and staff across many CWA locals, industry sectors, and regional districts, with several of note.

Emma Kinema was the first staff organizer hired in 2019 for what would become the CODE-CWA project, and veteran SEIU organizer Wes McEnany was the second full-time staff organizer hired by the time the effort launched publicly in early 2020, alongside dozens of other CWA staff members assisting across North America.

By early 2022 Emma Kinema had been promoted to Senior Campaign Lead and Wes McEnany left CWA to work on political campaigns. Former Writers Guild union organizer Isham Christie was a Senior Campaign Lead for CODE-CWA by at least 2022. In 2022, Jessica Gonzalez, a former Activision Blizzard QA tester, briefly worked as an organizer.

Parul Koul is a prominent CODE-CWA rank-and-file worker-organizer as a founding member of the Alphabet Workers Union (CWA Local 9009) campaign who was elected as executive chair and then president.

As of late 2026, Emma Kinema was still working as a CWA tech industry organizer.

== See also ==
- Communications Workers of America
- Tech unions in the United States
- Alphabet Workers Union
- Emma Kinema
- Google worker organization
- Game Workers Unite
- Tech Workers Coalition
