= 2018 in technology and computing =

Significant events that have occurred in 2018 in all fields of technology, including computing, robotics, electronics, as well as any other areas of technology as well, including any machines, devices, or other technological developments, occurrences, and items.

== January ==
- 1 January – Researchers at Harvard, writing in Nature Nanotechnology, reported the first single lens that can focus all colours of the rainbow in the same spot and in high resolution, previously only achievable with multiple lenses.
- 2 January – Physicists at Cornell University reported the creation of "muscle" for shape-changing, cell-sized robots.
- 3 January
  - Computer researchers reported discovering two major security vulnerabilities, named "Meltdown" and "Spectre," in the microprocessors inside almost all computers in the world.
  - Scientists in Rome unveiled the first bionic hand with a sense of touch that can be worn outside a laboratory.
- 4 January – MIT researchers devised a new method to create stronger and more resilient nanofibers.
- 15 January – Artificial intelligence programs developed by Microsoft and Alibaba achieved better average performance on a Stanford University reading and comprehension test than human beings.

== February ==
- 6 February – The Falcon Heavy test flight successfully launched at 20:45 UTC.

== March ==
- 17 March – Cambridge Analytica was exposed as having unconsentfully harvested data from millions of Facebook users, leading to lawsuits and fines against the latter, the shutdown of the former and the tarnishing of the latter's public reputation.

== April ==
- 20 April – The Nintendo Labo is released.

== August ==
- 24 August – The Bugatti Divo is revealed at “The Quail – A Motorsports Gathering“ in California, United States.

== September ==
- 4 September – The Xbox Adaptive Controller, designed to “adapt[...] input for gamers with limited mobility”, is released.

== October ==
- 11 October – The world's fastest camera, able to capture 10 trillion frames per second, is announced by the Institut national de la recherche scientifique (INRS) in Quebec, Canada.

== November ==
- 1 November – At around 11 AM, more than 20,000 Google employees worldwide participated in the 2018 Google walkouts to protest the company's handling of sexual harassment cases, along with other grievances.
