= Professionals Australia =

Australian trade union

- Association of Professional Engineers, Scientists and Managers, Australia
- Founded: 1917
- Headquarters: West Melbourne, Victoria (National Office) with branches in all Australian states and territories
- Location: Australia
- Members: ▼18,331 (as at 31 December 2024)
- Key people: Katie Havelberg, National Board President; Sam Roberts, CEO
- Affiliations: Australian Council of Trade Unions
- Website: www.professionalsaustralia.org.au

Professionals Australia, formerly the Association of Professional Engineers, Scientists and Managers Australia (APESMA), is an Australian trade union registered under state and federal industrial relations acts. It is affiliated with the Australian Council of Trade Unions (ACTU).

Professionals Australia organises workers across a broad range of workplaces and industries. It also performs many of the functions of a professional association as providing registration services for professional Engineers. Unlike most Australian unions, Professionals Australia is not affiliated to a political party.

Its membership is drawn from diverse professions, including such as engineers, managers, architects, IT professionals, pharmacists, and collieries staff, and is organised along occupational lines.

== History ==
Professionals Australia offer assessment in the areas of Civil, Electrical, Information, Technology and Telecommunications, Management, Mechanical and Structural Engineering.

A new division for video game developers, under Game Workers Unite Australia, was added in 2022.

== Industrial coverage ==
Professionals Australia has industrial coverage over:

- Engineers
- Pharmacists
- Scientists
- Collieries’ staff and officials
- Veterinarians
- Translators and interpreters
- Australian Government and Defence
- Information Technology (IT workers)
- Video game workers
- Software Developers
- Ambulance managers & professionals (Victoria)
- University students
- Local government engineers (New South Wales)
- Architects
- Managers and other professionals
