= Google and trade unions =

Tensions between the company Google and its workers in 2018 and 2019

Tensions between the multinational technology company Google and its workers escalated in 2018 and 2019 as staff protested company decisions on a censored search engine for China, military drone artificial intelligence, and internal sexual harassment.

Google employees formed trade unions in South Korea, the United States, the United Kingdom and elected a staff council in Switzerland. Subcontractors form basis for majority of unionizing at Google, including cafeteria services. The Alphabet Workers Union organizes workers across Alphabet Inc in the United States, the parent company of Google.

== Background ==
Alphabet, the parent company of the multinational technology company Google, has over 100,000 full-time employees internationally, in addition to contract employees. About half of Google's total workers are contractors, known internally as "TVCs": temps, vendors, and contractors. Google has seen a rise in worker activism since 2018, with a swiftly changing internal culture in which staff have been alienated by scandals including a 2017 memo about Google's culture and diversity policies, revelation of a large exit package offered to an executive accused of sexual harassment, and staff accusations of retaliation. Under the company's "third era"—in which Google contends with the effects of having brought its technology to scale—The Verge wrote that the foremost task of Google CEO Sundar Pichai is to stabilize the company's culture.

== Walkout ==
Google walkouts video in 2019.

A 20,000-employee walkout against Google executive sexual misconduct in November 2018 led to the company board opening an investigation. The walkout hastened organizing and protests within the company. Subsequent worker activism over work with the Pentagon and a censored Chinese search engine often entered the media spotlight. An engineer started a strike fund, matched by her own donation.

By mid-2019, Google appeared to push employee organizers to leave. Walkout organizers said that they were put on administrative leave for opaque reasons. In April, walkout organizers Meredith Whittaker and Claire Stapleton wrote that they were being demoted or reassigned as retaliation for their organizing. Stapleton left Google in June and Whittaker in July. In response, some employees participated in a sit-in and demanded that Google investigate its HR department. The company denied the allegations but instituted new policies against employee protest and in-office politics, which further eroded worker trust from parts of its staff. A September settlement with the National Labor Relations Board in response to Stapleton and Whittaker's departures required policy clarifications that explicitly let employees act collectively and discuss workplace issues with each other and the press. The settlement did not reduce tensions, which re-escalated in November when The New York Times reported that Google had been working for several months with IRI Consultants, a firm known for promoting union busting.

== Transnational ==
On January 25, 2020, the formation of an international alliance of Google trade unions, Alpha Global, was announced. The coalition is made up of "13 different unions representing workers in 10 countries, including the United States, United Kingdom, and Switzerland." The group is affiliated with UNI Global Union. The formation of the alliance is in response to persistent allegations of mistreatment of Google employees and a toxic workplace culture. Google had previously been accused of surveilling and firing employees who were suspected of organizing a workers union. In 2021 court documents revealed that between 2018 and 2020 Google ran an anti-union campaign called Project Vivian to "convince them (employees) that unions suck".

=== European Works Council ===
153 Google employees in 11 different European countries launched the process of forming a European Works Council. In March 2023, Google and the employee led Special Negotiating Body signed a European Works Council framework agreement and set an election date for 6 months later. The agreement notably includes the United Kingdom and Switzerland Google offices, even though they are not part of the European Union.

== South Korea ==
In April 2023, Google Korea and Google Cloud Korea formed a union with Korea Finance & Service Workers Union, which is affiliated to the Korean Confederation of Trade Unions to represent the 850 employees of Google Korea.

== Switzerland ==
Google Zürich was established in 2004 and is the largest research development of Google outside the US. Employees internally are known as Zooglers. In 2020, inspired by the Google walkouts, a group of Zooglers, with the assistance of Syndicom trade union formed a Staff Council (Swiss Standard German: Personalvertretung). In March 2023, hundreds of employees walked out after 200 Zooglers were laid off.

== United Kingdom ==
Google has 5,000 employees in the United Kingdom. Several hundred employees are members of Unite the Union as of 2023.

300 London-based Google DeepMind employees unionized with the Communication Workers Union in 2025, in response to Google dropping its pledge not to develop artificial intelligence that could be used for "harm." The ongoing Project Nimbus contract between Google and the Israeli Ministry of Defense was also cited. One year later, in May 2026, DeepMind employees voted to unionize and requested that Google recognize the joint-union representatives Communication Workers Union and Unite the Union.

== United States ==
=== The "Thanksgiving Four" ===
In November 2019, Google fired and suspended workers for media leaks and misuse of internal data, which some internal sources described as retaliation against activist staff. A publicized, 200-worker demonstration in San Francisco protested the suspension of Rebecca Rivers and Laurence Berland as unjust and demanded their reinstatement. Rivers had protested the U.S. Customs and Border Protection's (CBP) business with a Google cloud product, whereas Berland had protested YouTube's use of hate speech policy in relation to gay rights. Both Rivers and Berland spoke about their personal experiences at the rally, emphasizing the opaqueness behind being put on leave, particularly that they had not been told what they did wrong. Rivers said that the leave was about investigating her document access, but was questioned mostly in relation to her activism over Google's government contracts. Berland learned his own leave status through a news report.

Following the rally, Google fired Laurence Berland, Rebecca Rivers, Paul Duke, and Sophie Waldman, known together as the Thanksgiving Four, based on the firings' proximity to the holiday. A Google memo attributed the dismissals to security breaches, "accessing and distributing business information outside the scope of their jobs", and explained their action as a "rare" case. Internal activists described the recently changed access policy as vague and emphasized that viewing documents outside the scope of one's job was routine as part of Google's culture of openness and emphasized within the company's recruiting. Walkout organizers publicly accused Google of union busting through firing organizers, among other actions. Employer retaliation for collective action is prohibited under American federal law.

CNBC described the Thanksgiving Four firings as virally amplifying their critics' platform, turning them into overnight "heroes", and leading other employees to share stories of being targeted for activism. The public nature of the protests, with individual stories and identities attached, inspired other employees to participate. Google organizers that had since left Google continued their support online. CNBC wrote that Google harmed itself with its unspecific public response, which obscured the legitimacy of the firings and let critics circulate their own conclusions, namely that staff were being fired for organizing. These dismissals underscored the outsized role of internal dissent and the company's perplexed approach to it. The Verge wrote that dissent within Google was a result of societal grappling with how to handle a company with Google's power, and that the company's antagonistic handling of its most politically active employees was considered the biggest failure of CEO Pichai's tenure.

Around the same time, the company curtailed its weekly town hall meetings in response to leaks, reducing their frequency and narrowing their focus from general management questions to product and business strategy. The "TGIF" meetings had been a prominent component of Google's corporate culture of transparency. While the company had long taken action on leaks, journalists described the company's November actions as a "crackdown". Internal activists cited other recent policy changes in their accusation of company retaliation against collective action: employee guidelines on political speech, web browser history trackers, anti-union consultants, and a calendar tool to track events with over 100 participants. Court documents later showed that the company ran a program code-named Project Vivian during this period to engage workers and convince them against supporting unions.

=== Trade unions ===
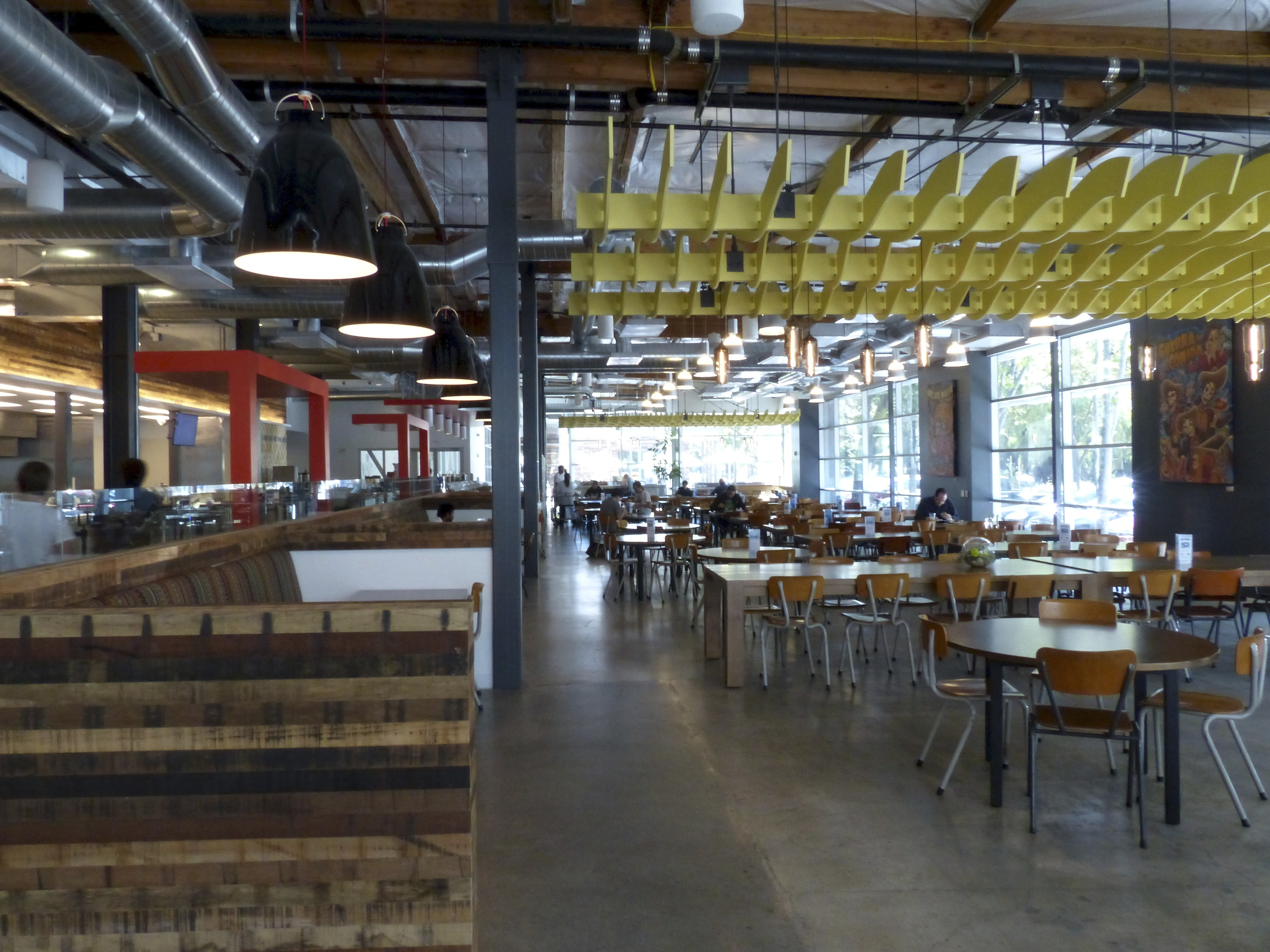
A cafeteria at Google's headquarters, 2013

On September 24, 2019, 80 HCL Technologies employees who subcontract for Google Shopping formed a union with the Pittsburgh-based United Steelworkers. Two years later, they ratified one of the first collective bargaining agreements for a tech company.

In early December 2019, the Communications Workers of America union filed a federal labor complaint against Google for the November Four firings, opening a National Labor Relations Board investigation for Laurence Berland, Rebecca Rivers, Paul Duke, and Sophie Waldman. The complaint argues that the company violated the National Labor Relations Act of 1935 and cites Google's code of conduct, which says, "don't be evil, and if you see something that you think isn't right—speak up!" The union also filed a complaint on behalf of Kathryn Spiers, an employee who said she was fired for building a reminder about worker protections in an internal HR guideline/policy reminder tool maintained by her team. Google said Spiers was fired not for the content of her message but for using a security and privacy tool for an unrelated purpose, and without business justification or team authorization. Spiers said that she received the appropriate approvals and her team lead confirmed that as the "owner" of that tool, Spiers did not need authorization to make such changes. The National Labor Relations Board returned a formal complaint against Google in December 2020 with the allegation of company interference in protected organizing activity.

Google's Bay Area cafeteria workers, contracted through the multinational food service company Compass Group, voted to unionize in late 2019. These 2,300 workers who prepare food and wash dishes are organizing with the union Unite Here, which is negotiating a contract with Compass Group. The cafeteria workers compose one of the largest bargaining units at an individual tech company and, according to Recode, demonstrated the growing strength of the tech labor movement. 90% of food-service staff for Google are unionized as of 2022.

=== Alphabet Workers Union ===
Alphabet Workers Union (AWU), also informally referred to as the Google Union, is an American trade union of workers employed at Alphabet Inc., Google's parent company, with a membership of over 800, in a company with 130,000 employees, not including temps, contractors, and vendors in the United States. It was announced on January 4, 2021, with an initial membership of over 400, after over a year of secret organizing, and the union includes all types of workers at Alphabet, including full-time, temporary, vendors and contractors of all job types.

It has been called a minority union and a solidarity union. AWU itself is not registered with the National Labor Relations Board and cannot engage in collective bargaining. In March 2022, subcontractors of Google Fiber became the first members within the AWU to gain NLRB recognition.

The Alphabet Workers Union itself is not recognized by the National Labor Relations Board. This is both due to difficulty of formally organizing a large company and also the different tiers of employment contracts. In March 2022, subcontractors of Google Fiber became the first within the AWU to gain NLRB recognition.

In February 2023, 40 Cognizant contractors who worked as content moderators for YouTube Music went on Google's first strike in protest of change to remote work policy that would require them to go to the office in Austin, Texas. A ruling in March 2023 by the NLRB regarding the liability of Google in joint-employment relations would mean that Google could be directly held liable for treatment of their sub-contracted companies. In April 2023, the contractors voted 41–0 to form the YouTube Music Union. Google would be obligated to negotiate with them, even though they are directly employed by Cognizant. In March 2024, the 43 contractors were notified of their termination by Cognizant during a live session with the Austin City Council. Google stated that these members of the union were not Google employees, and that the termination was simply due to the contract ending. The council passed a resolution asking Google to negotiate with the workers.

In November 2023, Accenture contract workers at Google voted to form a union. This unionization effort started in June when contractors were asked to handle lewd prompts from the initial Bard chatbot. Google appealed the NLRB's designation of them as a joint-employer with Accenture. Google denies being an employer as of December 2024, so AWU signed a collective agreement with just Accenture in the meantime. The agreement bans keystroke logging (a form of employee monitoring), guarantees permanent remote work, amongst other things. It would apply to the 25 employees.

== See also ==
- Unionization in the tech sector
- Amazon worker organization
- IBM and unions
- Microsoft and unions
- Tech Workers Coalition
