= Game Workers Unite =

Labor rights group for the video game industry

- Formation: March 2018; 8 years ago
- Type: Labor rights group
- Website: gameworkerscoalition.org

Game Workers Unite is a worker-run, labor rights group seeking to organize the video game industry. Founded during events surrounding the March 2018 Game Developers Conference, the flat organization has grown to over a thousand members across more than 20 international chapters.

The group's goal is a single union for all games workers, including artists, designers, producers, and programmers. Game Workers Unite has supported actions including Riot Games's 2019 walkout over sex discrimination and social media campaigns against CEOs who executed layoffs. The British chapter of Game Workers Unite is legally recognized as a union within the Independent Workers' Union of Great Britain and is working to end crunch overtime practices, improve diversity and inclusion, support targeted workers, and ensure steady and fair wages. Game Workers Unite co-founder Emma Kinema was hired by the Communications Workers of America to organize workers in the high tech and video game industries in early 2020, the first American initiative of its kind in those sectors.

== Description ==
Game Workers Unite seeks to organize a trade union for video game developers to improve working conditions. Their activists are largely anonymous game developers from both indie and major firms. The group's flat organization eschews leaders and coordinates through Discord and Facebook. Their goal is a single union for all developers, including programmers, artists, designers, and producers, with subgroups within the union representing disciplines. In Australia, where the industry is smaller, Game Workers Unite wants to include esports professionals and marketing staff as well. They have argued that working conditions will only improve when studio managers are forced, and that workers cannot wait for managers to set realistic deadlines, fairer hiring practices, and to keep those promises. They also seek to show the emphasize the humans and conditions behind the making of games and have argued that, allied with consumers, workers can fight business practices that concern gamers, such as gambling-based gameplay mechanics.

Some of the largest issues motivating the industry's organizing efforts include crunch time, when developers work overtime to finish a project in its last weeks, and social issues such as diversity and inclusion in the predominantly white and male industry.

== History ==
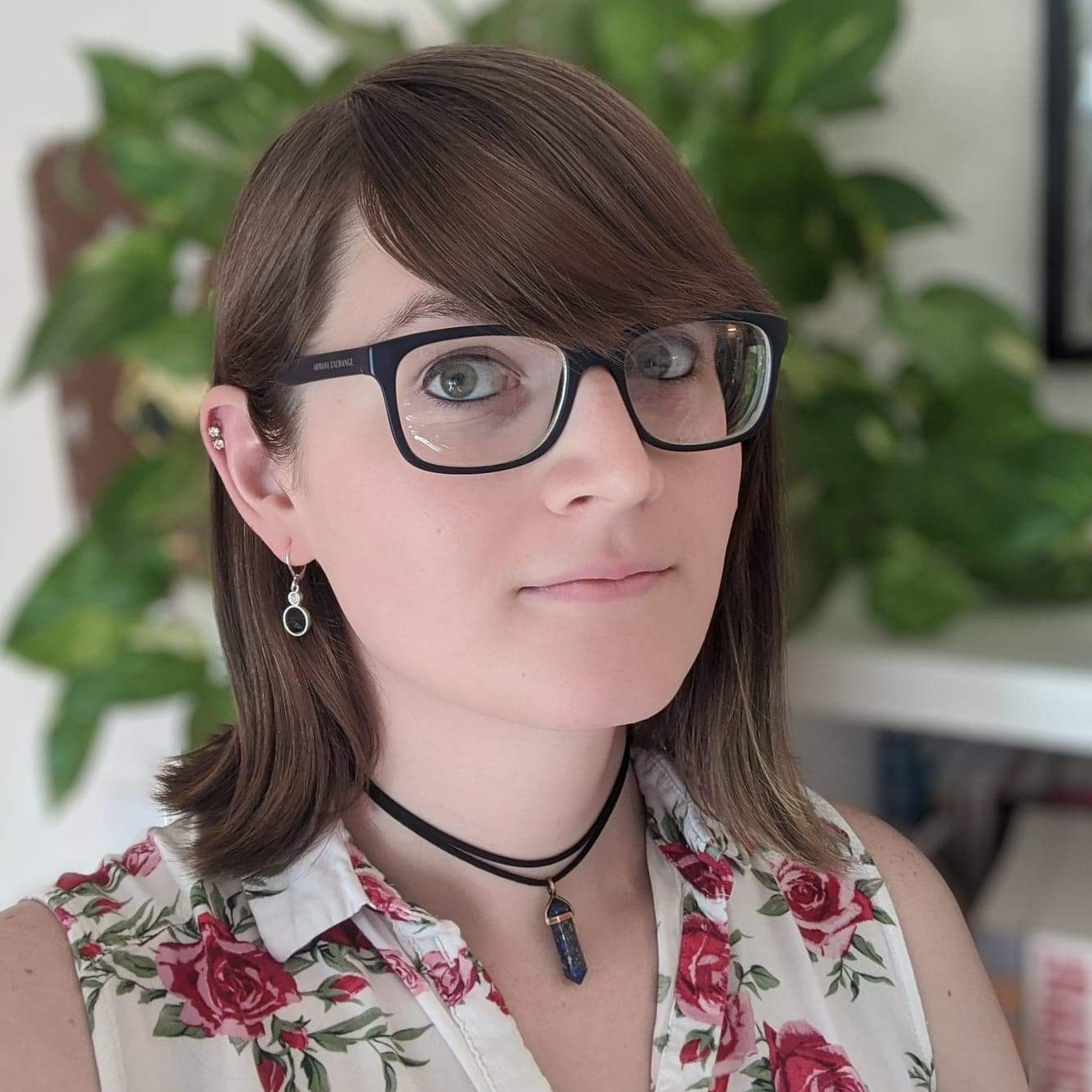
Emma Kinema

Game Workers Unite was at the center of a 2018 push for video game industry unionization. In March 2018, the collective evolved from a private game developers Facebook Group to a Discord server where over 100 games industry members congregated. The group's website soon collected 200 pledges of support to unionize the games industry. Their first action was to distribute informational materials at the Game Developers Conference later that month. The results were a turning point for pro-union momentum in the industry. Following a panel on arguments for and against unionization at the conference, developers expressed interest in unionization on social media. Within a few weeks, Game Workers Unite was officially founded and its membership quickly rose from less than 10 to about 300. Membership was about 600 by November 2018, and in the thousands across over 20 international chapters by mid-2019, including cities such as Los Angeles, Montreal, San Francisco, and Vancouver. The group keeps its members' employers private, has no official membership count, and does not announce its nascent campaigns, though at least 12 were in progress as of late 2018. Game Workers Unite's protest badges and pamphlets became quickly visible at developer expositions worldwide. Variety named the Game Workers Unite organizers and Emma Kinema (the group's most public figure) among the most influential people in video games in 2018, and by the March 2019 Game Developers Conference, AFL–CIO representation began outreach with video game workers.

When considering its strategy, the group first met with media unions such as the Writers Guild of America and Screen Actors Guild before reaching out to smaller games communities. They hoped to build relationships with established unions and local developer communities before expanding to the global industry and collaborating with groups like the International Game Developers Association. The group saw the breadth and volume of roles in the games industry as posing potential difficulty for a single union strategy. The workplaces affiliated with Game Workers Unite campaigns include those with less than 100 and those with thousands. Some are working in conjunction with labor unions and others are working only with Game Workers Unite. The group also advocates for worker cooperatives.

Kinema helped to organize the May 2019 walkout at Riot Games over its handling of sex discrimination. After employees attended a 2018 Game Workers Unite meeting, Kinema helped them create an organizing committee and advised the walkout organizers via phone. The company announced that it would retain its forced arbitration policy but would create a diversity and inclusion group. The organizers are working towards a worker-led group for rectifying burnout and overwork. The Communications Workers of America hired Kinema in early 2020 to organize workers in the video game and tech industries, the first such American union-sanctioned initiative in those sectors, launching the Campaign to Organize Digital Employees.

Game Workers Unite's other actions have included social media campaigns to fire CEOs presiding over layoffs, such as Activision's Bobby Kotick and ArenaNet's Mike O'Brien. The group retracted their campaign on the latter based on his employee and fan support. Game Workers Unite issued a statement calling attention to the disparity in job security across game worker roles, with developers and artists generally safe while quality assurance testers and event organizers were being laid off and furloughed.

The group's British chapter, Game Workers Unite UK, became a legally recognized union within the Independent Workers' Union of Great Britain in December 2018. Their four goals are ending unpaid overtime, bettering diversity and inclusion, educating and promoting targeted workers, and establishing steady and fair wages. It was the country's first games industry union. Workers at ZA/UM unionized under IWGB Game Workers in October 2025. Workers at Rockstar Games began the process to unionize under IWGB Game Workers in 2025.

Game Workers Unite Toronto partnered with Communication Workers of America in early 2020. Game Workers Unite Australia became a union under Professionals Australia in 2022.

== See also ==
- Google worker organization
- Tech Workers Coalition
