= Alphabet Workers Union =

Trade union of workers

- Founded: January 4, 2021; 5 years ago
- Location(s): United States and Canada
- Members: 1,200 (Oct. 2022)
- Affiliations: Campaign to Organize Digital Employees, CWA Local 9009
- Website: alphabetworkersunion.org

Alphabet Workers Union (AWU), also informally referred to as the Google Union, is an American trade union of workers employed at Alphabet Inc., Google's parent company, with a membership of over 800, in a company with 130,000 employees, not including temps, contractors, and vendors in the United States. It was announced on January 4, 2021, with an initial membership of over 400, after over a year of secret organizing, and the union includes all types of workers at Alphabet, including full-time, temporary, vendors and contractors of all job types.

It has been called a minority union and a solidarity union. AWU itself is not registered with the National Labor Relations Board and cannot engage in collective bargaining. In March 2022, subcontractors of Google Fiber became the first members within the AWU to gain NLRB recognition.

== History ==
On 4 February 2021, union members expressed support of data center workers, including Shannon Wait, employed through Adecco contractor, who were demanding the right to drink water at work and discussing wages and other working conditions. Subsequently, Wait was suspended by the company for her pro-union activities, which AWU protested against through a legal charge. On 10 February, the union announced Wait was re-admitted to work after pressure from the union.

== Positions ==
Members have stated that their union fights to improve workers' wages; fights against abuse, retaliation and discrimination; and advocates on behalf of disadvantaged workers at Google such as contractors. It also fights to stop sexual harassment in the workplace and aims to stop Google from allowing its social media platforms such as YouTube to function as a hub for right-wing extremism and white supremacy.

Union members have argued that Alphabet has the ability to act in a wrongful manner for the sake of profit, and that forming a union allows workers to improve the world through pressuring the company to drop its bad practices and ensure tech labor is used for good purposes. Union members have also asserted that the company has retaliated against workers for speaking out, and that unionization allows workers to have a say in how certain company matters are run. The union itself serves as a mechanism for workers to speak safely, granting protection via collective strength and solidarity.

== Union recognition ==
The Alphabet Workers Union itself is not recognized by the National Labor Relations Board. This is both due to difficulty of formally organizing a large company and also the different tiers of employment contracts. In March 2022, subcontractors of Google Fiber became the first within the AWU to gain NLRB recognition.

In February 2023, 40 Cognizant contractors who worked as content moderators for YouTube Music went on Google's first strike in protest of change to remote work policy that would require them to go to the office in Austin, Texas. A ruling in March 2023 by the NLRB regarding the liability of Google in joint-employment relations would mean that Google could be directly held liable for treatment of their sub-contracted companies. In April 2023, the contractors voted 41–0 to form the YouTube Music Union. Google would be obligated to negotiate with them, even though they are directly employed by Cognizant. In March 2024, the 43 contractors were notified of their termination by Cognizant during a live session with the Austin City Council. Google stated that these members of the union were not Google employees, and that the termination was simply due to the contract ending. The council passed a resolution asking Google to negotiate with the workers.

In November 2023, Accenture contract workers at Google voted to form a union. This unionization effort started in June when contractors were asked to handle lewd prompts from the initial Bard chatbot. Google appealed the NLRB's designation of them as a joint-employer with Accenture. Google denies being an employer as of December 2024, so AWU signed a collective agreement with just Accenture in the meantime. The agreement bans keystroke logging (a form of employee monitoring), guarantees permanent remote work, amongst other things. It would apply to the 25 employees.

== See also ==
- 2018 Google walkouts
- Google worker organization
- Tech Workers Coalition
