= Meredith Whittaker =

American artificial intelligence research scientist

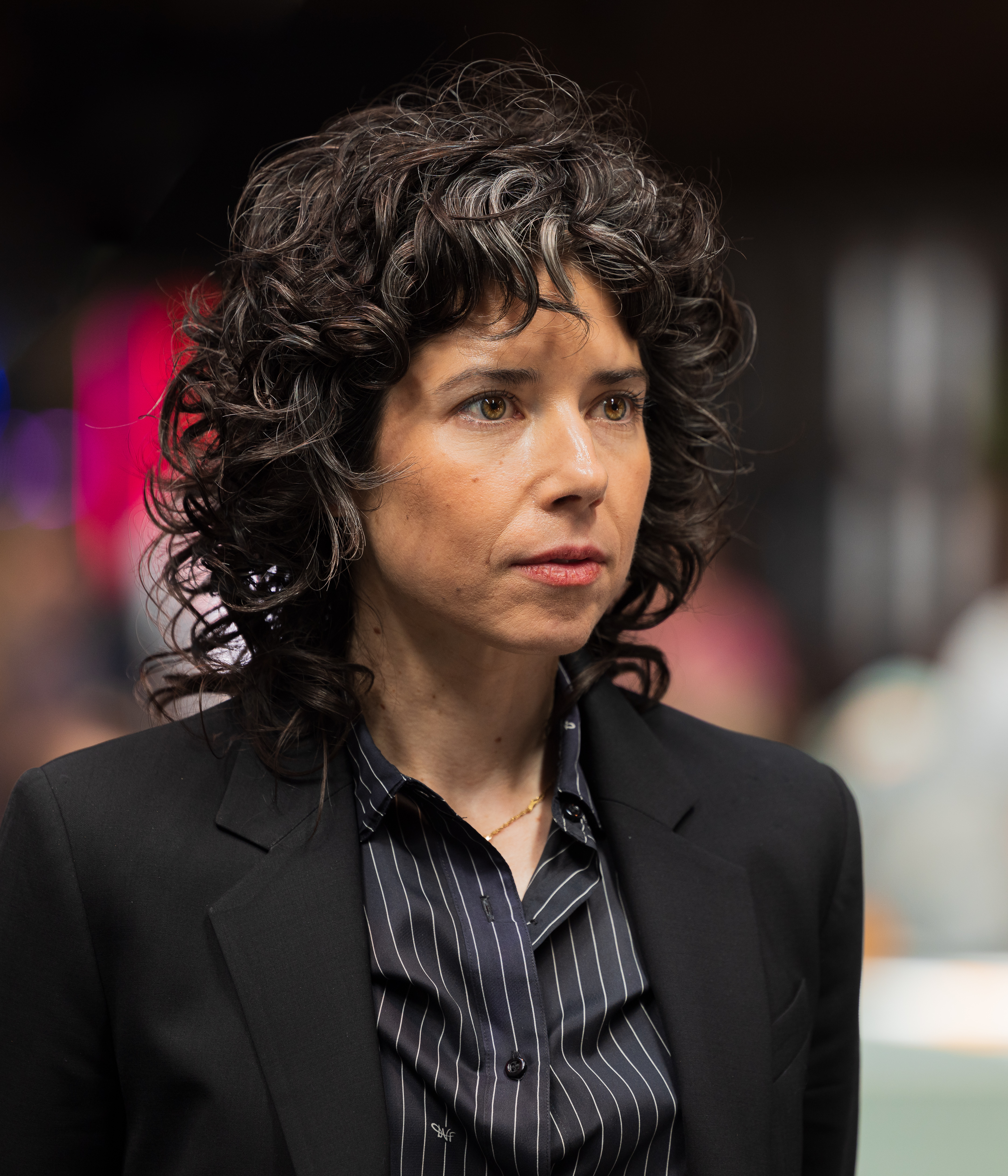
- Whittaker in 2023
- Education: University of California, Berkeley
- Employers: Google (2006–2018); Signal Foundation (2022–current)

Meredith Whittaker is the president of the Signal Foundation and serves on its board of directors. She was formerly the Minderoo Research Professor at New York University (NYU), and chief advisor and former faculty director & co founder of the AI Now Institute. She also served as a senior advisor on AI to Chair Lina Khan at the Federal Trade Commission and was listed among the 100 most influential people in AI by TIME magazine in 2023. Whittaker was employed at Google for 13 years, where she founded Google's Open Research group and co-founded the M-Lab. In 2018, she was a core organizer of the Google Walkouts and resigned from the company in July 2019. In July 2025, she joined the Board of Directors at the German media company Hubert Burda Media.

== Early life and education ==
Whittaker completed her bachelor's degree in rhetoric and English literature at University of California, Berkeley.

== Research and career ==
Whittaker is the president of the Signal Foundation and serves on their board of directors. She was formerly the Minderoo Research Professor at NYU, and the Faculty Director of NYU’s AI Now Institute.

Whittaker was a speaker at the 2018 World Summit on AI. She has written for the American Civil Liberties Union.

Whittaker co-founded M-Lab, a globally distributed network measurement system that provides the world’s largest source of open data on Internet performance. She has also worked extensively on issues of data validation, privacy, the social implications of artificial intelligence, the political economy of tech, and labor movements in the context of tech and the tech industry. She has spoken out about the need for privacy and against weakening encryption. She has advised the White House, the FCC, the FTC, the City of New York, the European Parliament, and many other governments and civil society organizations on artificial intelligence, Internet policy, measurement, privacy, and security.

=== Google ===
She joined Google in 2006. She founded Google Open Research which collaborated with the open source and academic communities on issues related to net neutrality measurement, privacy, security, and the social consequences of artificial intelligence.

In 2018, Whittaker was one of the core organizers of the Google Walkouts, with over 20,000 Google employees walking out internationally to protest Google's culture when it comes to claims of sexual misconduct and citizen surveillance. They released a series of demands, some of which were met by Google.

The walkout was prompted by Google's reported $90 million payout to vice president Andy Rubin who had been accused of sexual misconduct, and the company's involvement with Project Maven, against which more than three thousand Google employees signed a petition written by Whittaker. Τhe project was established by a contract between the U.S. military and Google, through which Google was to develop machine vision technologies for the U.S. drone program. Following the protests, Google did not renew the Maven contract.

Whittaker was part of the movement that called for Google to rethink their AI ethics council after the appointment of Kay Coles James, the president of The Heritage Foundation who has fought against LGBT protections and advocated for Donald Trump’s proposed border wall. Whittaker claimed that she faced retaliation from Google, and wrote in an open letter that she had been told by the company to "abandon her work" on enforcing ethics in technology at the AI Now Institute.

=== AI Now ===
Whittaker is the co-founder and chief advisor, and formerly the faculty director, of the AI Now Institute at New York University (NYU), a leading university institute dedicated to researching the social implications of artificial intelligence and related technologies which she started with Kate Crawford in 2017 after a symposium hosted by the White House. AI Now is partnered with the New York University Tandon School of Engineering, New York University Center for Data Science and Partnership on AI. They have produced annual reports that examine the social implications of artificial intelligence, including bias, rights and liberties.

=== Congressional testimony ===
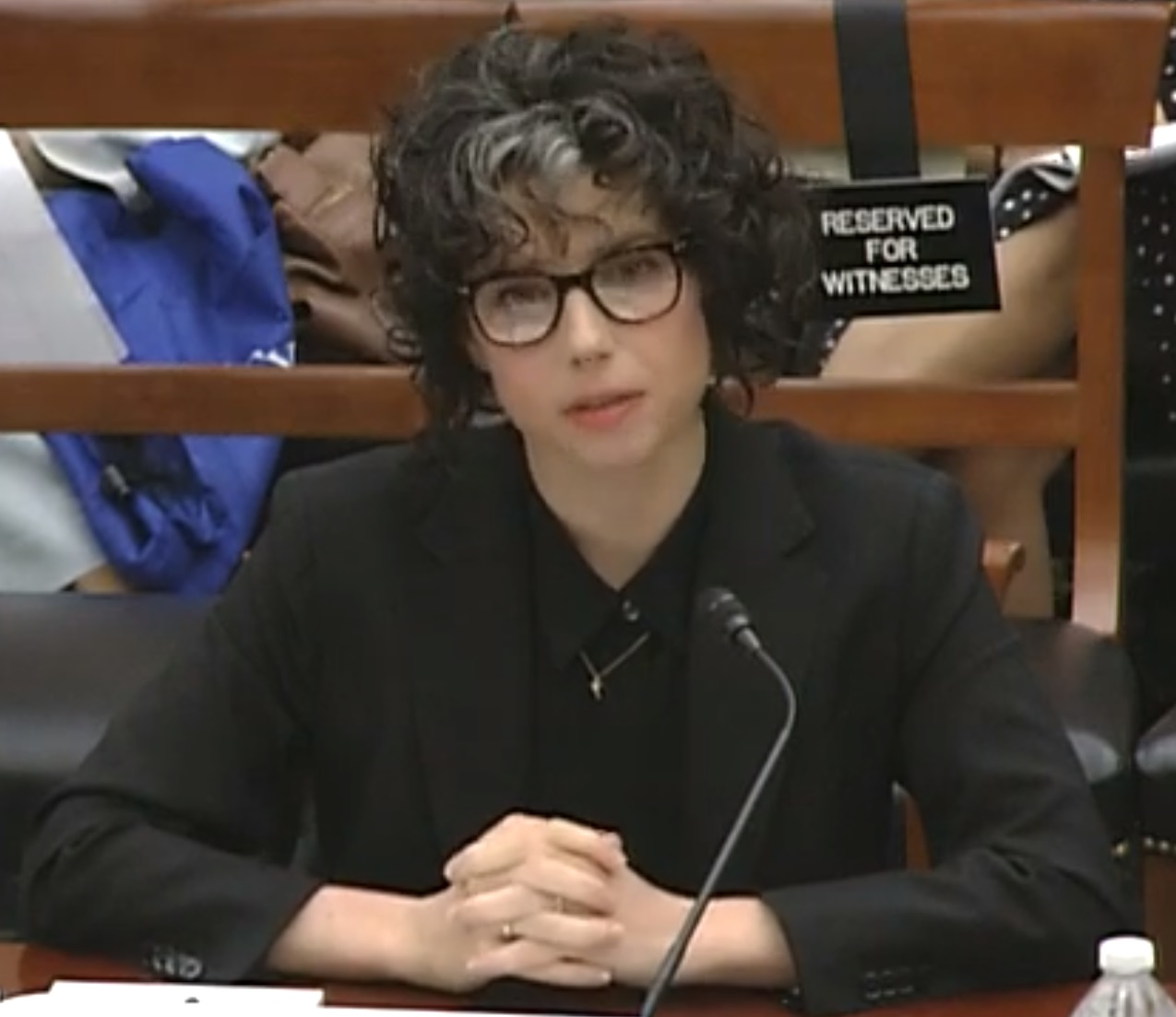
Whittaker testifies before the House Science, Space, and Technology Committee in 2019

Whittaker has testified before Congress, including testimony to the U.S. House Committee on Science, Space & Technology on "Artificial Intelligence: Societal and Ethical Implications" in June 2019. In her testimony, Whittaker pointed to research and cases showing that AI systems can entrench bias and replicate harmful patterns. She called for whistleblower protections for tech workers, arguing that the centrality of tech to core social institutions, and the opacity of tech deployment, made such disclosures crucial to the public interest.

She testified to the House Oversight Committee on “Facial Recognition Technology: Ensuring Commercial Transparency & Accuracy” in January 2020. She highlighted structural issues with facial recognition and the political economy of the industry, where these technologies are used by powerful actors on less powerful actors in ways that can entrench marginalization. She made the case that ‘bias’ was not the core concern, warned against an over reliance on technical audits that could be used to justify the use of systems without tackling structural issues such as the opacity of facial recognition systems, and the power dynamics that attend their use. Her testimony also pointed to the lack of sound scientific support for some of the claims used by private vendors, and called for a halt to the use of these technologies.

=== Federal Trade Commission ===
In November 2021, Lina Khan confirmed that Whittaker had joined the U.S. Federal Trade Commission as a senior advisor on artificial intelligence to the chair. Once announced as Signal's president, at the beginning of September 2022, she reported the ending of her term at the FTC.

=== Signal ===
On September 6, 2022, Whittaker announced that she would be starting as Signal's president on September 12. Signal described the role as "a new position created in collaboration with Signal’s leadership".
