= Project Maven =

US AI military intelligence program

Algorithmic Warfare Cross Functional Team
- Abbreviation: AWCFT
- Nickname: Project Maven
- Formation: April 26, 2017; 9 years ago
- Founder: Robert O. Work
- Type: Department of Defense cross-functional team
- Legal status: Active
- Purpose: Adoption of machine learning and data integration for military intelligence workflows and automatic target recognition
- Key people: Col. Drew Cukor; Lt. Gen. Jack Shanahan; VADM Frank "Trey" Whitworth
- Parent organization: National Geospatial-Intelligence Agency

Project Maven (officially Algorithmic Warfare Cross Functional Team) is a United States Department of Defense initiative launched in 2017 to accelerate the adoption of machine learning and data integration across US military intelligence workflows, specifically in intelligence, surveillance, target acquisition, and reconnaissance as well as in geospatial intelligence.

It initially focused on applying computer vision for processing images and videos for intelligence purposes. Currently, the program operates under the National Geospatial-Intelligence Agency (NGA) and encompasses multiple applications across the Department of Defense spanning military operation targeting support, data integration and visualization for analysts, and training machine learning models on labeled datasets of military assets and infrastructure. It integrates data from drones, satellites, and other sensors to flag potential targets, present findings to human analysts, and relay their decisions to operational systems.

The program originated under Deputy Secretary Robert O. Work after he raised concerns about China's advances in defense applications of artificial intelligence. Project leaders, Colonel Drew Cukor, USMC, and Lt. Gen. Jack Shanahan, framed the program as human-in-the-loop decision support inside the Department of Defense rather than as an autonomous weapons platform.

Contractors supporting Maven have included Google, which withdrew in 2018 after internal protests, and follow-on integrators such as Palantir, Anduril, Amazon Web Services, and Anthropic (withdrew in 2026).

The Pentagon credits Maven with providing 2024 targeting support for US airstrikes in Iraq, Syria, and Yemen, along with locating hostile maritime assets in the Red Sea.

== Administrative history ==
Initially, the effort was led by Robert O. Work who was concerned about China's military use of the emerging technology. Reportedly, Pentagon development stops short of acting as an AI weapons system capable of firing on self-designated targets. The project was established in a memo by the US deputy secretary of defense on 26 April 2017 proposing an "Algorithmic Warfare Cross-Functional Team". With the help of the Defense Innovation Unit, the project obtained the support of top talents in AI outside of the traditional defense contracting base. It was initially funded for $70 million. Jack Shanahan was the director of the project during April 2017 to December 2018.

At the second Defense One Tech Summit in July 2017, Cukor said that the investment in a "deliberate workflow process" was funded by the Department [of Defense] through its "rapid acquisition authorities" for about "the next 36 months".

In the defense industry, the standard procedure for the military to acquire hardware is by way of research, development, test, and evaluation (RDT&E), followed by production and sustainment. In 2017, acquiring software was done in the same way as hardware. This created a problem, since software is constantly updated. Project Maven procured software using Broad Agency Announcements, a flexible contracting vehicle that categorized software as consistently RDT&E, allowing constant updating. Another issue was that the government usually acquired the intellectual property (IP) for procured software, and with the project, only parts of the IP of the software was acquired. Cukor used the principle of "platform IP belongs to the vendor, configurations on top are the customer's". For example, Palantir retained IP to their core platform, while the government obtained the IP to Maven-specific logic configured on top of it.

According to US Air Force Lt. Gen. Jack Shanahan in November 2017, it is "designed to be that pilot project, that pathfinder, that spark that kindles the flame front of artificial intelligence across the rest of the [Defense] Department". Its chief, US Marine Corps Col. Drew Cukor, said: "People and computers will work symbiotically to increase the ability of weapon systems to detect objects." Project Maven has been noted by allies, such as Australia's Ian Langford, for the ability to identify adversaries by harvesting data from sensors on UAVs and satellites.

As of 2017 December, 150,000 images had been manually labelled to establish the first training data sets, and it was projected to reach one million by January 2018.

Project Maven was funded for $221 million in fiscal 2020. In 2020, the House and Senate conferees on the National Defense Authorization Act for Fiscal Year 2021, agreed to the Senate's recommendation to fund the Pentagon's $250 million request for Project Maven.

At the GEOINT Symposium of 2022, it was announced that Project Maven was transferred from the Office of the Under Secretary of Defense for Intelligence and Security to the NGA, under President Biden's proposed budget for Fiscal Year 2023. It became a Program of Record on 2023 November 7. Frank "Trey" Whitworth, vice admiral, was the director of NGA from June 2022 to November 2025. Whitworth was initially skeptical of the program, suspecting it was incautious about the targeting principles, but later regarded it as "important work".

As of 2024, the project is jointly administered by the NGA and the CDAO, and its director is Rachel Martin. Before 2025, Biden appointees within CDAO had held back AI development for safety and reliability concerns, though as of 2025, this has stopped. As of 2024, Maven provided the cloud infrastructure, software capabilities, and AI for CDAO's Combined Joint All-Domain Command and Control initiatives.

As of summer 2025, there were eight Maven initiatives. Of these, five were in the NGA, including analyzing drone feeds and satellite imagery.

On 18 September 2025, the UK government announced a new partnership with Palantir to develop AI-powered military capabilities for decision-making and targeting, identifying opportunities worth up to £750 million over five years.

On 25 March 2025, the NATO Communications and Information Agency and Palantir finalized the acquisition of the Palantir Maven Smart System NATO (MSS NATO) for employment within NATO's Allied Command Operations. It was planned to be used within 30 days of acquisition.

In a letter to Pentagon on 9 March 2026, Steve Feinberg stated that Project Maven will become an official program of record by September 2026, the close of the current fiscal year. The project would transfer from the NGA to the CDAO within 30 days. Future contracting with Palantir would be handled by the US Army. In March 2026, it was announced that the US Army Combined Arms Command would integrate Maven into its training.

== Technology ==
Project Maven analyst view

Project Maven uses machine learning algorithms to analyze and fuse vast amounts of surveillance data from multiple sources made possible through data integration using Palantir Technologies.

Project Maven system architecture diagram

The data sources include photographs, satellite imagery, geolocation data (IP address, geotag, metadata, etc) from communications intercepts, infrared sensors, synthetic-aperture radar, and more. The system is mainly used for assisting analysts in intelligence, surveillance, target acquisition, and reconnaissance. Machine learning systems, including object recognition systems, process the data and identify potential targets, such as enemy tanks or location of new military facility. The training dataset included at least 4 million images of military objects such as warships, labeled by humans. The user interface is called Maven Smart System. It could display information such as aircraft movements, logistics, locations of key personnel, locations on the no-strike list, ships, etc. Yellow-outlined boxes show potential targets. Blue-outlined boxes show friendly forces or no-strike zones. It could also transmit, directly to weapons, a human decision to fire weapons. Internal documentation referred to "Maven ATR: automatic target recognition".

Initially the project focused on applications of computer vision. The project's leaders were particularly impressed by model performance on ImageNet. As of 2018, the purpose of the system was AI-enabled analysis of full-motion video. In 2022 it expanded to combatant commands under the AI and Data Acceleration Initiative.

In 2022, it was reported that the project expanded to non-image data, including captured enemy material, maritime intelligence, and publicly available information.

In 2024, it was stated that Maven's key technical contribution was data management: Maven standardizes heterogeneous data through an ontology layer so data can be fused, exchanged across cloud and edge systems, and used by multiple applications. The system was presented as a broader data-centric warfighting system that feeds apps for planning, preparing, and executing operations.

In 2024, the Broad Area Surveillance-Targeting (BAS-T) is a part of Maven. The system detects objects in images and uses data fusion to produce a common operational picture containing "priority based, in-depth assessment of the enemy systems present within the commander's area of responsibility" in a unified user interface, suitable for "a low-bandwidth tactical network". Data used by BAS-T include commercial and national space based electro-optical (EO) and synthetic-aperture radar (SAR). Another component of Maven was the target workbench, which prioritizes targets and routes the target information to any of the following for prosecution: AFATDS (for artillery), or published as a J series 3.X track via Joint Range Extension Applications Protocol or JREAP-C or JREAP-A. In particular, during the Scarlet Dragon Oasis exercise (Jan. 23 to Feb. 3, 2023), Maven interfaced through JREAP-A via an Air Operations Center, where a B-52 Bomber dropped live ordnance at a training target. Maven can also interface with the Joint Automated Deep Operations Coordination System.

As of 2024, the Maven used by CENTCOM integrated 179 data sources from land, sea, air, space, and cyber. It could "discern the nearest available weapons, the most suitable ones for the task, flying time, weapons loading details, and the whereabouts of personnel and partners". Operators of Maven's Target Workbench could approve or disapprove targets, sequence them according to priorities, and message directly to weapons systems.

As of 25 March 2025, it was reported that the system at that point incorporated LLMs, generative models, and machine learning, to enhance intelligence fusion and targeting, battlespace awareness and planning, and accelerated decision-making. It was reported to have a "model hub" where multiple LLMs were available, including different versions of OpenAI's ChatGPT and Meta's Llama.

It was reported in 2025 that Maven could interface with the Aviation Mission Planning System through the Tactical Airspace Integration System in the Airspace Coordination Order.

As of September 2025, the director of the NGA claimed that by June 2026, Maven will begin to transmit "100 percent machine-generated" intelligence to combatant commanders using LLM technology. Booz Allen was the defense contractor responsible for the LLM-integration phase.

In 2025 November, in a disaster response exercise by the Alaska Army National Guard, Maven used publicly available datasets such as road systems and US Geological Survey earthquake data layers into its geospatial intelligence to produce the common operating picture. It was also integrated with Incident Command System Form 213RR, which allowed teams to track requests for assistance and match them with Title 10 or Title 32 resources.

Cameron Stanley, the Pentagon's chief digital and artificial intelligence officer, said at the 2026 AIPCon 9 conference that Maven was being "deploy[ed] across the entire department". Stanley described the system's AI Asset Tasking Recommender, which recommends which bombers and munitions should be assigned to targets. In the same demonstration, he described the process of selecting a target with the words "Left click, right click, left click." Maven is integrated with Palantir's Artificial Intelligence Platform (AIP), and Palantir's Army Intelligence Data Platform, an intelligence platform sold to the US Army. The AIP included various tools using LLM, including Maven Threads for "ad hoc analyses with user-uploaded documents", Maven Agent Studio for "interactive assistants equipped with enterprise-specific information and tools.", Maven Logic for "no-code development tool for building, testing, and releasing functions powered by LLMs", Machine-Assisted Disclosure as a "centralized portal for tracking foreign disclosure policy, processing requests, and auto-disseminating releasable products to partner networks".

During the 2026 Iran war, the US military used Maven Smart System to support its campaign against Iran. The Washington Post reported that the system, powered then by Anthropic's Claude, analyzed classified satellite, surveillance and other intelligence data to suggest, locate and prioritize targets. This allowed the striking of over 1,000 targets in the first 24 hours of the war.

Maven's targeting throughput has also been described in terms of potential increases in the number of targets processed in a fixed period of time. Earlier reporting stated that its computer vision capabilities increased the rate of target-per-day from less than 100 to approximately 1,000. The integration of LLMs increased that rate to 5,000 targets-per-day. A separate report described potential future capability to support strikes against more than 1,000 targets per hour.

== Contractors ==
In 2013, the intelligence community partnered with Amazon to allow classified material to be processed on Amazon Web Services (AWS).

Initially, the Pentagon collaborated with Google, but in 2018, Google employees, including Meredith Whittaker, staged walkouts protesting Google's involvement in Project Maven. The contract was estimated to be worth around $9 million. Subsequently, Google did not renew the contract with Pentagon and Palantir took over the contract.

In 2018, Booz Allen Hamilton was awarded a large prime award as part of Project Maven totaling $751.5 Million. One of the companies subcontracted for social media analytics as part of this award was Popily.

DigitalGlobe provides images and algorithms to Project Maven. The NGA approached IBM for using its AI systems to analyze videos, though IBM did not sign a contract.

Companies that have contributed to the data integration include Palantir, Amazon (through AWS), ECS Federal, L3Harris Technologies, Maxar Technologies, Microsoft and Sierra Nevada Corporation. ECS Federal has served as primary support contractor and led AI integration for Project Maven since 2017. At least 21 private companies had been involved.

Anduril Industries entered the program in 2018 to deploy its sensor fusion platform and edge hardware for data capture. In December 2024 Anduril and Palantir announced a consortium that links Anduril's Lattice Mesh with Maven Smart System and Palantir's AI Platform to move tactical sensor data into AI-supported analyst workflows.

In May 2025, the Pentagon raised its contract ceiling for Maven Smart System to $1.3 billion through 2029, up from the previous $480 million. NGA also signed a new $28 million contract to expand access.

In 2025-07, CDAO announced contract awards to Anthropic, Google, OpenAI, and xAI, each with a $200M ceiling, to develop "agentic AI workflows across a variety of mission areas".

In 2025-08, Marine Corps had used Maven via SIPRnet (IL-6 cloud).

In 2025-11, NGA awarded an indefinite delivery/indefinite quantity contract to Enabled Intelligence for data labeling in support of Maven's computer vision models, for a ceiling of $708 million over a 7-year ordering period.

Cameron Stanley, CDAO, stated that Grok Gov was used in Maven to "support vital national security missions, including targeting, intelligence, readiness, and recruitment", and to process nearly two billion tokens per day ("roughly equivalent to 1.5 billion words or up to 6 million pages of text").

In 2026-05, the DoD announced that SpaceX, OpenAI, Google, NVIDIA, Reflection, Microsoft, Amazon Web Services, and Oracle would be offering "advanced AI capabilities" under Department's Impact Level 6 (IL6) and Impact Level 7 (IL7) network environments.

=== Anthropic ===
In 2023 and 2024, Amazon invested in Anthropic. Also in 2024, Palantir partnered with Anthropic to integrate Claude into Palantir's software. Anthropic stated that Claude was used to help the military to process data and make decisions. In late 2024, the Pentagon began to integrate Claude into Maven. As reported in 2024 November, Claude 3 and 3.5 family of models were integrated into Palantir's AI Platform running on AWS. They received Defense Information Systems Agency Impact Level 6 accreditation. In 2025 June, Anthropic announced "Claude Gov", which runs in classified environments on the AWS by the national security community. In 2025 July, Anthropic announced that the Department of Defense, through Chief Digital and Artificial Intelligence Office (CJADC2), awarded Anthropic a two-year prototype other transaction agreement with a $200 million ceiling to "prototype frontier AI capabilities that advance US national security". In February 2026, Jack Shanahan stated that Anthropic is a partner of Project Maven.

Separately, in April 2025, Anthropic joined Palantir's FedStart program so Claude could be deployed for government customers at FedRAMP High and DoD Impact Level 5, running on Google Cloud, offering assistance to millions of federal government employees.

As of February 2026, Maven was running on Amazon Web Services (AWS), and incorporates a version of Claude, a series of AI systems developed by Anthropic.

On March 4, 2026, the Department of Defense designated Anthropic as a supply chain risk, decreeing that all use of Anthropic products be phased out in all US military within six months. Shyam Sankar, CTO of Palantir, stated that after Anthropic could no longer be used for Maven or general use by the DoD, the models used by Maven included proprietary models including those provided by xAI and OpenAI, and open-weight models including Nemotron.

== Applications ==
=== Training exercises ===
The 18th Airborne Corps is the main tester of Project Maven. With collaborating arms organization in US and UK, it has used Maven and weapons systems connected to it to strike targets from bombers, fighter jets and drones.

Beginning in 2020, Maven was used for live-fire exercises ("Scarlet Dragon exercises") to improve the technology via a development-security-operations (DevSecOps) cycle. The first took place at Fort Bragg. The test teamed soldiers from the XVIII Airborne Corps with Marines from II Marine Expeditionary Force. An AI system identified a tank in satellite images, the human approved, and the AI system signaled an M142 HIMARS to strike the target (in this case, a tank variously described as either inflated or decommissioned). It was the first AI-enabled artillery strike in the US army. However, the targeting process took 743 minutes.

It was also used during Project Convergence 2020 training rounds, as one of several AI systems that participated.

The Scarlet Dragon exercises were overseen by former XVIII Airborne Corps commander Michael Kurilla, who became the commander of CENTCOM in 2022 April, and installed a data-centric command approach that included Maven. In 2024, it was reported that the Scarlet Dragon exercises were still ongoing in 2024, and was planned throughout 2025.

There are 6 steps in the kill chain: identify, locate, filter down to the lawful valid targets, prioritize, assign them to firing units, and fire. In 2024, it was reported that of these six, Maven can perform four. A senior targeting officer estimates that with Maven, he could decide on 80 targets per hour, versus 30 targets per hour without Maven. The time for the targeting process has decreased to under 1 minute. The efficiency was comparable with the targeting cell used during Operation Iraqi Freedom, but whereas the OIF used a targeting cell with roughly 2,000 staff, the 18th Airborne used a targeting cell with 20 people.

It was stated in 2024 that, while deployed in Europe, Maven iterated with industry through 62 capability evolutions in ten months.

By August 2025, NATO's Joint Warfare Centre (JWC) said MSS NATO had been deployed across Allied Command Operations, that JWC staff were being trained on it, and that it had already been incorporated into NATO exercises such as STEADFAST DETERRENCE 2025 May, with broader use planned in 2026. JWC described it as NATO's first AI-enabled warfighting command-and-control system. It was later used at STEADFAST DUEL 2025 October as the primary platform for warfighting integration.

In November 2025, the Maven Common Operating Picture was used in SETAF-AF's Lion Deployment Readiness Exercise.

It was stated in 2025 by Palantir to be "production-level" across INDOPACOM, EUCOM, CENTCOM, NORAD/NORTHCOM, SPACECOM, TRANSCOM, AFRICOM, and the Joint Staff, with additional deployments at CYBERCOM, STRATCOM, and SOUTHCOM. This was every unified combatant command except SOCOM.

During 2023-2025, Maven appeared in 141 exercises and experiments.

=== Real use ===
The first real use of Maven was in 2017 in East Africa, by Special Forces pursuing the Islamist group al-Shabaab.

In early December of 2017, Maven was fielded to defense intelligence analysts to support drone missions against ISIS.

In the 2021 Kabul airlift, Maven was used to display the situation on the ground. It could simultaneously display data feeds, such as aircraft movements, logistics, threats and locations of key personnel such as Chris Donahue.

In the 2022 Russian invasion of Ukraine, the US used satellite intelligence and Maven Smart System to supply the locations of Russian equipment to Ukrainian forces.

Alerted by the October 7 attacks, CENTCOM quickly shifted Maven from exercises to real use in combat. In February 2024, Maven was used for narrowing targets for airstrikes in Iraq and Syria, and was involved in more than 85 airstrikes. It was also used for locating rocket launchers in Yemen and surface vessels in the Red Sea, some of which were destroyed in February 2024, according to CENTCOM.

During Hurricane Helene in 2024, the public affairs office of XVIII Airborne Corps used Maven to visualize social media sentiment from Sprinklr.

It was claimed in 2024 that CENTCOM used it as a shared data/AI system that fused 179 live data feeds and supported command-and-control, fires, force protection, and sustainment workflows. It was used in four-star headquarters with over 20 subordinate headquarters. CENTCOM had ~13,000 Maven accounts, of which ~2,500 were regular users who logged in at least a few times a week. The 138th Field Artillery Brigade used it during Operation Spartan Shield and Operation Inherent Resolve.

It was reported in May 2025 that Maven had over 20,000 active users. It was reported in March 2026 that at least 32 different companies were working on Maven, and close to 25,000 US personnel were using it. NORAD and NORTHCOM had 2,000 daily users in 2025.

In September 2025, Maven was used by the Customs and Border Protection for detecting border crossings on the southern border, and with the US Coast Guard.

At an unspecified time, Maven was used by SOUTHCOM "in the detection, classification, and ultimate interdiction of more than three dozen vessels suspected of engaging in illicit or clandestine activity".

In November 2025 it was used by the Alaska State Defense Force, during emergency response to Typhoon Halong, in western Alaska to display real-time GPS locations, supply tracking and short messages on a single map (the common operating picture). Maven integrated data from handheld satellite tracking devices called SHOUT Nanos.

In January 2026, Maven and Claude were used during the intervention in Venezuela, including the raid that captured then President Nicolás Maduro.

Also in 2026, Maven was used in the 2026 Iran war. It allowed the striking of over 1,000 targets in the first day. A later statement by Cameron Stanley, CDAO, stated that a Grok Gov model was used via Maven to enable deployment of over 2,000 munitions to 2,000 distinct targets within 96 hours.
