= 2018 Google walkouts =

Worldwide protest organized by Google employees

The 2018 Google walkouts were a series of employee walkouts that occurred across Google offices on November 1, 2018. The walkout had a large number of participants. The employees demanded five concrete changes from the company: an end to forced arbitration; a commitment to end pay inequality; a transparent sexual harassment report; an inclusive process for reporting sexual misconduct; and elevate the Chief of Diversity to answer directly to the CEO and create an Employee Representative. A majority of the known organizers have left the company since the walkout and many continue to voice their concerns. Google agreed to end forced arbitration and create a private report of sexual assault, but has not provided any further details about the other demands.

== Background ==
This walkout was initially intended to be "day without women" and later evolved when a larger number of attendees accumulated. There were seven main organizers that asked for an end to sexual harassment, discrimination, and systematic racism. An organizer, Tanuja Gupta, worked in a group called "Googlers for Ending Force of Arbitration" which aided in the growth of momentum towards the sexual assault issue.

== The walkout ==
'Google Silicon Valley Employees Join a Worldwide Protest' - video news report from Voice of America

On November 1, 2018, at approximately 11 am, more than 20,000 Google employees engaged in a worldwide walkout to protest the way in which the company handled cases of sexual harassment, and other grievances. The protest came one week after a New York Times report named Andy Rubin as having been paid a $90 million severance package despite being asked to resign due to sexual misconduct allegations, as well as other executives with similar allegations towards them who also received severance packages. The core organizers were Claire Stapleton, Tanuja Gupta, Meredith Whittaker, Celie O'Neil-Hart, Stephanie Parker, Erica Anderson, and Amr Gaber. The walkout was organized in less than three days and lasted for a half hour.

Striking workers used a flyer that read:

Hi. I'm not at my desk because I'm walking out in solidarity with other Googlers and contractors to protest sexual harassment, misconduct, lack of transparency, and a workplace culture that's not working for everyone. I'll be back at my desk later. I walked out for real change.

The main demand was the act of transparency from a company, the presence of an employee representative, and the public filings of each sexual assault case. There were many signs held up during the course of the protest. One said "What do I do at Google? I work hard every day so the company can afford $90,000,000 payouts to execs who sexually harass my co-workers", another said "Don't be evil".

== Ongoing activism at Google ==
- 2018: In December 2018, contract workers for Google wrote an open letter with demands addressing disparities between employees and contractors.
- 2020: Timnit Gebru, an AI specialist, dismissal situation.

== Retaliation and union busting ==
The Tech Workers Coalition provided a retaliation hotline during the Google Walkouts for employees who faced retribution for their participation.

Two of the Google Walkouts organizers, Claire Stapleton and Meredith Whittaker, claimed that Google retaliated against them following the Google Walkouts by attempting to force them out or demote them. They organized a sit-in on May 1, 2019, International Workers' Day. By July 2019, four of the seven organizers, including Stapleton and Whittaker, had left the company.

In late 2019, the National Labor Relations Board (NLRB) opened an investigation into the firing of four Google employees over their efforts to unionize. In late 2020, following the investigation, the NLRB filed a complaint stating that the fired workers were not responsible for any wrongdoing and accusing Google of "terminations and intimidation in order to quell workplace activism". It also accused Google of unlawful surveillance for accessing the employees' calendars and other internal documents. The administrative hearing for the case is scheduled for April 12, 2021.

In late 2019, The New York Times reported that Google had hired IRI Consulting, a company that provides anti-unionization services.

== Impact and outcome ==
Some of the demands made were met or partly met. Many of Google's responses included the reiteration of commitment to past diversity objectives and the improvement of the process to report harassment. The two resolutions that came closest to the employees' demands were the publishing of sexual assault cases, although the company opted for a private, internal report rather than a public one, and increased transparency of sexual assault. In February 2019 Google announced the end of forced arbitration for employees for all claims.

== See also ==
- Alphabet Workers Union
