= Tech Workers Coalition =

Labor rights group

- Abbreviation: TWC
- Established: 2014; 12 years ago
- Founders: Rachel Melendes & Matt Schaefer
- Founded at: Silicon Valley
- Type: Labor organization
- Region served: United States
- Methods: Community organizing, labor organizing
- Field: Big Tech
- Website: techworkerscoalition.org

The Tech Workers Coalition is a labor rights group seeking to organize the tech industry.

== History ==
The group was founded between cafeteria worker and labor organizer Rachel Melendes and engineer Matt Schaefer. Their first meetings began in 2014 in its members' apartments. The group set out to create an alternative to the Californian Ideology that emphasized worker labor. The group's name emphasizes the ideas that white-collar employees are workers and that the lower-wage jobs created to support those white-collar jobs are part of the same industry. These ideas are in contrast to industry norms that ameliorate engineer working conditions, including food and perk luxuries on campus, horizontal reporting structures, and casual dress codes. Engineers at big tech companies are also often separated from the blue-collar independent contractors who provide the campus services. The group also responds to the disillusionment of workers who entered the industry to bring societal value through the Internet but instead found other company objectives to be paramount. In 2015, the Tech Workers Coalition focused its efforts on organizing Hyatt hotel workers in Santa Clara, California.

The presidential election of Donald Trump accelerated membership in the Tech Workers Coalition. Many workers at major tech companies saw themselves as responsible for creating platforms that let fake news propagate, the alt-right find an audience, and the Trump presidency potentially surveil its critics. Photos from a December 2016 Trump Tower meeting between United States President-elect Donald Trump and senior leaders of Alphabet, Amazon, Apple, and Facebook renewed interest in counter-activism. The Tech Workers Coalition began to focus on organizing engineers. In January 2017, the group led a protest of 70 people, including employees from major tech companies, at the data analytics company Palantir in opposition to the company's surveillance work for U.S. Immigration and Customs Enforcement. The Tech Workers Coalition started a petition for Stanford University alumni, a popular recruiting spot, to pledge not to join Palantir. This Palantir protest work continued into 2019. The Tech Workers Coalition prominently participated in Bay Area May Day demonstrations.

In early 2017, several Tech Workers Coalition members assisted the labor union Unite Here in organizing cafeteria staff at their companies, particularly at Facebook. The members pledged their support, made public gestures of solidarity at the company, and collected union cards. By July, the Facebook cafeteria workers had unionized.

The Tech Workers Coalition joined other organizations for a workshop series, "Tech Won't Build It", in which tech workers shared lessons in convincing their companies to cease work on controversial government projects. In 2019, the Tech Workers Coalition advised NPM employees behind a failed unionization attempt and helped to organize tech worker presence at the September 2019 climate strikes.

Within the movement of tech industry activists seeking to change the industry's practices through their employees, the Tech Workers Coalition is the most radical group. They train gig, contract, and full time workers to organize for better pay, conditions, and treatment in the tech sector. Their workshops include introductions to labor law and spaces to share workplace experiences. As of late 2017, the group had about 500 users on its instant messaging tool and had small chapters in cities including Boston, New York, and Seattle. The group is all-volunteer and horizontal, unlike most labor union hierarchies, and is premised on solidarity between higher-wage engineers and lower-wage workers.

== See also ==
- Game Workers Unite
- Google worker organization
