= List of mergers and acquisitions by Meta Platforms =

Meta Platforms logo

Meta Platforms (formerly Facebook, Inc.) is a technology company that has acquired 91 other companies, including WhatsApp. The WhatsApp acquisition closed at a steep $16 billion; more than $40 per user of the platform. Meta also purchased the defunct company ConnectU in a court settlement and acquired intellectual property formerly held by rival Friendster. The majority of the companies acquired by Meta are based in the United States, and in turn, a large percentage of these companies are based in or around the San Francisco Bay Area. Meta has also made investments in LuckyCal and Wildfire Interactive.

Most of Meta's acquisitions have primarily been "talent acquisitions" and acquired products are often shut-down. In 2009, Meta (as Facebook) CEO Mark Zuckerberg posted a question on Quora, titled "What startups would be good acquisitions for Facebook?", receiving 79 answers. He stated in 2010 that "We have not once bought a company for the company. We buy companies to get excellent people... In order to have a really entrepreneurial culture one of the key things is to make sure we're recruiting the best people. One of the ways to do this is to focus on acquiring great companies with great founders." The Instagram acquisition, announced on April 9, 2012, appears to have been the first exception to this pattern. While continuing with a pattern of primarily talent acquisitions, other notable product focused acquisitions include the $19 billion WhatsApp acquisition and the $2 billion Oculus VR acquisition.

== Acquisitions ==
| Number | Company | Location | Acquired on | Acquired for (USD) | Adjusted for Inflation (USD) | Talent acquired | Related to | Used as / integrated with | Ref. |
|---|---|---|---|---|---|---|---|---|---|
| 1 | facebook.com domain name | USA, Boston, Massachusetts | August 23, 2005 | 200,000 | 0 | — | — | name change from Thefacebook.com | |
| 2 | Parakey | USA, Mountain View, California | July 19, 2007 | — | — | Blake Ross, Joe Hewitt | Y Combinator, Sequoia Capital | Facebook Mobile | |
| 3 | ConnectU | USA, Cambridge, Massachusetts | June 23, 2008 | 31,000,000 | 46,000,000 | — | i2Hub | (Court settlement) | |
| 4 | FriendFeed | USA, Mountain View, California | August 10, 2009 | 47,500,000 | 71,000,000 | Paul Buchheit, Bret Taylor, Jim Norris, Sanjeev Singh, 8 others | Benchmark Capital, ex-Google | — | |
| 5 | Octazen | Malaysia, Taman Melawati, Kuala Lumpur | February 19, 2010 | — | — | 2 engineers (remote workers) | — | Websluths | |
| 6 | Divvyshot | USA, San Francisco, California | March 2, 2010 | — | — | Sam Odio, Paul Carduner | Y Combinator, AngelList | Facebook Photos | |
| 7 | Friendster patents | USA, Mountain View, California / Malaysia, Kuala Lumpur | May 13, 2010 | 40,000,000 | 59,000,000 | — | — | — | |
| 8 | ShareGrove | USA, San Mateo, California | May 26, 2010 | — | — | Kent Libbey, Adam Wolff | Elm Street Ventures | Facebook Groups | |
| 9 | Zenbe | USA, New York, NY, New York | July 6, 2010 | — | — | Tom Alison, Will Bailey, Robert Kieffer | — | Facebook Messenger | |
| 10 | Nextstop | USA, San Francisco, California | July 8, 2010 | 2,500,000 | 4,000,000 | Charles Lin, Carl Sjogreen, Adrian Graham | ex-Google | — | |
| 11 | Chai Labs | USA, Mountain View, California | August 15, 2010 | 10,000,000 | 15,000,000 | Gokul Rajaram, Giri Rajaram, others | Merus Capital, ex-Google | — | |
| 12 | Hot Potato | USA, Brooklyn, New York | August 20, 2010 | ~10,000,000 | ~15,000,000 | Saadiq Rodgers-King, Justin Shaffer, 6 others | RRE Ventures | Facebook Places | |
| 13 | Drop.io | USA, Dumbo, Brooklyn, New York | October 29, 2010 | ~10,000,000 | ~15,000,000 | Sam Lessin | RRE Ventures | — | |
| 14 | FB.com domain name | USA, Washington, D.C. | November 15, 2010 | 8,500,000 | 13,000,000 | — | — | — | |
| 15 | Rel8tion | USA, Seattle, Washington | January 25, 2011 | undisclosed | undisclosed | Peter Wilson | — | — | |
| 16 | Beluga | USA, Palo Alto, California | March 2, 2011 | undisclosed | undisclosed | Jonathan Perlow, Lucy Zhang, Ben Davenport | — | Facebook Messenger | |
| 17 | Snaptu | Israel, Tel Aviv | March 20, 2011 | 70,000,000 | 100,000,000 | — | — | — | |
| 18 | RecRec | USA, San Francisco, California | March 24, 2011 | undisclosed | undisclosed | — | Dogpatch Labs | — | |
| 19 | DayTum | USA, SoHo, New York City | April 27, 2011 | undisclosed | undisclosed | Nicholas Felton, Ryan Case | — | — | |
| 20 | Sofa | Netherlands, Amsterdam | June 9, 2011 | undisclosed | undisclosed | Koen Bok, Dirk Stoop, Jasper Hauser, Hugo van Heuven, Jorn van Dijk | — | — | |
| 21 | MailRank | USA, New York, New York | June 9, 2011 | undisclosed | undisclosed | Bryan O'Sullivan and Bethanye McKinney Blount | — | — | |
| 22 | Push Pop Press | USA, San Francisco, California | August 2, 2011 | undisclosed | undisclosed | Co-founders Mike Matas and Kimon Tsinteris | — | — | |
| 23 | Friend.ly | USA, Mountain View, California | October 10, 2011 | undisclosed | undisclosed | Co-founder/CEO Ed Baker | — | — | |
| 24 | Strobe | USA, San Francisco, California | November 8, 2011 | undisclosed | undisclosed | Founder and CEO Charles Jolley, other Strobe employees | — | Mobile engineering team | |
| 25 | Gowalla | USA, Austin, Texas | December 2, 2011 | — | — | — | — | — | |
| 26 | Caffeinatedmind | USA, California | February 20, 2012 | — | — | — | — | — | — |
| 27 | Instagram | USA, San Francisco, California | April 9, 2012 | 1,000,000,000 | 1.402×10^{9} | — | — | — | — |
| 28 | Tagtile | USA, San Francisco, California | April 13, 2012 | undisclosed | undisclosed | Tagtile's founders | — | — | |
| 29 | Glancee | USA, San Francisco, California | May 5, 2012 | undisclosed | undisclosed | Andrea Vaccari, Alberto Tretti, Gabriel Grisé | — | Facebook Nearby Friends | |
| 30 | Lightbox.com | UK, London, England | May 15, 2012 | undisclosed | undisclosed | Thai Tran, Nilesh Patel, Five employees | — | — | |
| 31 | Karma | USA, San Francisco, California | May 21, 2012 | undisclosed | undisclosed | Lee Linden, Ben Lewis | — | Facebook Gifts | |
| 32 | Face.com | Israel, Tel Aviv | June 18, 2012 | 100,000,000 | 140,000,000 | — | — | — | |
| 33 | Spool | USA, San Francisco, California | July 14, 2012 | undisclosed | undisclosed | Avichal Garg, Curtis Spencer, Six employees | — | Mobile engineering team | |
| 34 | Acrylic Software | Canada, Vancouver, British Columbia | July 20, 2012 | undisclosed | undisclosed | Two employees | — | Facebook's design team | |
| 35 | Threadsy | USA, San Francisco, California | August 24, 2012 | undisclosed | undisclosed | — | — | — | |
| 36 | Atlas Solutions | USA, Seattle, Washington | February 28, 2013 | <100,000,000 | <138,000,000 | — | — | — | |
| 37 | osmeta | USA, Mountain View, CA | March 2013 | — | — | 17 engineers | — | — | |
| 38 | Storylane (Mixtent) | USA, Palo Alto, CA | March 2013 | — | — | Jonathan Gheller, 5 engineers | — | — | |
| 39 | Hot Studio | USA, New York, New York, San Francisco, California | March 14, 2013 | — | — | — | — | — | |
| 40 | Spaceport | USA, Burlingame, California | April 23, 2013 | — | — | — | — | — | |
| 41 | Parse | USA, San Francisco, California | April 25, 2013 | 85,000,000 | 117,000,000 | — | — | — | |
| 42 | Monoidics | UK, London, England | July 18, 2013 | — | — | — | — | — | |
| 43 | Jibbigo | USA, Pittsburgh, Pennsylvania | August 12, 2013 | — | — | — | — | — | |
| 44 | Onavo | Israel, Tel Aviv | October 13, 2013 | — | — | Guy Rosen, CEO | — | — | |
| 45 | SportStream | USA, San Francisco, California | December 17, 2013 | — | — | — | — | — | |
| 46 | Little Eye Labs | India, Bengaluru, Karnataka | January 8, 2014 | 15,000,000 | 20,000,000 | — | — | — | |
| 47 | Branch | USA, New York, New York | January 13, 2014 | 15,000,000 | 20,000,000 | — | — | — | |
| 48 | WhatsApp | USA, Mountain View, California | February 19, 2014 | 19,000,000,000 | 2.5840×10^{10} | Co-founder and CEO Jan Koum | — | — | |
| 49 | Oculus VR | USA, Irvine, California | March 25, 2014 | 2,000,000,000 | 2.720×10^{9} | Co-founders Palmer Luckey and Brendan Iribe, Engineer Chris Dycus, and CTO John D. Carmack | — | Reality Labs | |
| 50 | Ascenta | UK, Somerset, England | March 27, 2014 | 20,000,000 | 27,000,000 | — | — | — | |
| 51 | Salorix | USA, Palo Alto, CA | April 14, 2014 | undisclosed | undisclosed | Santanu Bhattacharya | — | Facebook Ads | |
| 52 | ProtoGeo Oy | Finland, Helsinki | April 24, 2014 | undisclosed | undisclosed | — | — | Moves mobile app; discontinued in July 2018 | |
| 53 | PrivateCore | USA, Palo Alto, California | August 7, 2014 | undisclosed | undisclosed | — | — | — | |
| 54 | LiveRail | USA, San Francisco, California | August 14, 2014 | 400,000,000 - 500,000,000 | 544,000,000 - 680,000,000 | — | — | — | |
| 55 | WaveGroup Sound | USA, Burlingame, California | August 26, 2014 | undisclosed | undisclosed | — | — | — | |
| 56 | Wit.ai | USA, Palo Alto, California | January 6, 2015 | undisclosed | undisclosed | — | — | — | |
| 57 | Quickfire Networks | USA, San Diego, California | January 8, 2015 | undisclosed | undisclosed | — | — | — | |
| 58 | TheFind, Inc. | USA, Mountain View, California | March 14, 2015 | undisclosed | undisclosed | — | — | — | |
| 59 | Surreal Vision | UK, London, England | May 26, 2015 | undisclosed | undisclosed | — | — | — | |
| 60 | Pebbles | Israel, Kfar Saba | July 16, 2015 | 60,000,000 | 81,000,000 | — | — | — | |
| 61 | Endaga | US, Oakland, California | October 3, 2015 | undisclosed | undisclosed | — | — | — | |
| 62 | MSQRD (Masquerade) | Belarus, Minsk | March 9, 2016 | undisclosed | undisclosed | CEO, Eugene Nevgen, Sergey Gonchar, Eugene Zatepyakin (co-founders) | — | — | |
| 63 | Two Big Ears | UK, Scotland | May 23, 2016 | undisclosed | undisclosed | — | — | — | |
| 64 | Nascent Objects | US, California | September 19, 2016 | undisclosed | undisclosed | — | — | — | |
| 65 | Infiniled | Ireland, Cork | October 10, 2016 | undisclosed | undisclosed | — | — | — | |
| 66 | CrowdTangle | USA | November 11, 2016 | undisclosed | undisclosed | — | — | — | |
| 67 | Faciometrics | USA, Pittsburgh, Pennsylvania | November 16, 2016 | undisclosed | undisclosed | Fernando De la Torre | Carnegie Mellon University | — | |
| 68 | Zurich Eye | Switzerland | November 2016 | undisclosed | undisclosed | — | — | Oculus VR | |
| 69 | Ozlo | USA, Palo Alto, California | July 31, 2017 | undisclosed | undisclosed | — | — | Facebook Messenger | |
| 70 | Fayteq AG | Germany | August 2017 | undisclosed | undisclosed | — | — | Facebook Live | |
| 71 | tbh | USA, Oakland, California | October 16, 2017 | undisclosed | undisclosed | CEO Nikita Bier, CTO Erik Hazzard, Kyle Zaragoza, Nicolas Ducdodon | — | — | |
| 72 | Confirm | USA, Boston, Massachusetts | January 23, 2018 | undisclosed | undisclosed | Bob Geiman, Ralph Rodriguez, Walt Doyle | — | — | |
| 73 | Bloomsbury AI | UK, London, England | July 2018 | 30,000,000 | 38,000,000 | — | — | — | |
| 74 | Redkix | Israel, Tel Aviv | July 26, 2018 | 100,000,000 | 128,000,000 | Oudi Antebi, Roy Antebi | — | Workplace by Facebook | |
| 75 | Vidpresso | USA, Ogden, Utah | August 13, 2018 | undisclosed | undisclosed | Randall Bennett, Justin Carter, Pauli Ojala, Hassan Salahuddin | Y Combinator | — | |
| 76 | Dreambit | USA, Seattle, Washington | September 2016 | undisclosed | undisclosed | Ira Kemelmacher-Shlizerman, Eli Shlizerman | University of Washington | Reality Labs | |
| 77 | Chainspace | UK, London, England | February 2019 | — | — | George Danezis, Shehar Bano, Alberto Sonnino | University College London | Facebook Blockchain | |
| 78 | GrokStyle | USA, San Francisco, California | February 8, 2019 | undisclosed | undisclosed | Kavita Bala, Sean Bell | — | — | |
| 79 | Servicefriend | Israel, Tel Aviv | September 2019 | undisclosed | undisclosed | Ido Arad, Shahar Ben Ami | — | Novi | |
| 80 | CTRL-labs | USA, New York City, New York | September 2019 | undisclosed, but reportedly between $500 million and $1 billion | undisclosed, but reportedly between $0 million and $0 billion | Thomas Reardon, Patrick Kaifosh | — | Reality Labs | |
| 81 | Packagd | USA, San Francisco, California | September 2019 | undisclosed | undisclosed | — | — | Facebook Marketplace | |
| 82 | Beat Games | Czech Republic, Prague | November 2019 | undisclosed | undisclosed | — | — | Oculus Studio | |
| 83 | Atlas ML | UK, London, England | December 2019 | undisclosed | undisclosed | — | — | — | |
| 84 | PlayGiga | Spain, Madrid | December 2019 | 70,000,000 | 88,000,000 | — | — | — | |
| 85 | Sanzaru Games | USA, Foster City, California | February 2020 | undisclosed | undisclosed | — | — | Oculus Studio | |
| 86 | Scape Technologies | UK, London, England | February 2020 | ~40,000,000 | ~50,000,000 | — | — | Reality Labs | |
| 87 | Giphy | USA, San Francisco, New York | May 15, 2020 | 400,000,000 | 50,000,000 | — | — | Instagram | |
| 88 | Mapillary | Sweden, Malmö | June 18, 2020 | undisclosed | undisclosed | — | — | — | |
| 89 | Ready at Dawn | USA, Irvine, California | June 22, 2020 | undisclosed | undisclosed | — | — | Oculus Studio | |
| 90 | Lemnis Technologies | Singapore, Singapore | September 18, 2020 | undisclosed | undisclosed | Pierre-Yves Laffont | — | Reality Labs | |
| 91 | Kustomer | USA, New York, New York | November 30, 2020 | 1,000,000,000 | 1.244×10^{9} | — | — | — | |
| 92 | Downpour Interactive | USA, San Francisco, California | April 30, 2021 | undisclosed | undisclosed | — | — | Oculus Studio | |
| 93 | Unit 2 Games | UK, Leamington Spa | June 4, 2021 | undisclosed | undisclosed | — | — | Facebook Gaming | |
| 94 | BigBox VR | USA, Seattle, Washington | June 11, 2021 | undisclosed | undisclosed | — | — | Oculus Studio | |
| 95 | AI.Reverie | USA, New York, NY, New York | October 11, 2021 | undisclosed | undisclosed | — | — | — | |
| 96 | Within | USA, Los Angeles, California | October 29, 2021 | undisclosed | undisclosed | — | — | Oculus Studio | |
| 97 | Twisted Pixel Games | USA | November 1, 2021 | undisclosed | undisclosed | — | — | Oculus Studio | |
| 98 | Accusonus | Greece, | February, 2022 | ~€70 - €100 million | ~94,000,000 | | | Regroover, Drumatom, ERA products | |
| 99 | Presize | Germany, Munich | April 8, 2022 | ~100,000,000 | ~110,000,000 | Leon Szeli, Tomislav Tomov | Technical University of Munich | Facebook Shops, Instagram Shopping | |
| 100 | Lofelt | Germany, Berlin | September 2022 | undisclosed | undisclosed | — | — | — | |
| 101 | Armature Studio | USA | October 11, 2022 | undisclosed | undisclosed | — | — | Oculus Studio | |
| 102 | Camouflaj | USA | October 11, 2022 | undisclosed | undisclosed | — | — | Oculus Studio | |
| 103 | Luxexcel | Netherlands | December 30, 2022 | undisclosed | undisclosed | — | — | Oculus Studio | |
| 104 | Play AI | USA | July 11, 2025 | undisclosed | undisclosed | — | — | Meta Superintelligence Labs | |
| 105 | WaveForms | USA | August 8, 2025 | undisclosed | undisclosed | — | — | Meta Superintelligence Labs | |
| 106 | Rivos | USA | September 30, 2025 | undisclosed | undisclosed | — | — | Meta Training and Inference Accelerator | |
| 107 | Limitless | USA | December 5, 2025 | undisclosed | undisclosed | — | — | — | |
| 108 | Manus AI | Singapore | December 29, 2025 | >2,000,000,000 | >2.000×10^{9} | — | — | — | |
| 109 | Moltbook | USA | March 10, 2026 | undisclosed | undisclosed | Matt Schlicht, Ben Parr | — | Meta Superintelligence Labs | |
| 110 | Assured Robot Intelligence | USA | May 1, 2026 | undisclosed | undisclosed | — | — | — | |
| 111 | Stilla | Sweden, Stockholm | September 9, 2026 | undisclosed | undisclosed | Siavash Ghorbani, Kaj Drobin | — | Meta Business Agent | |

== See also ==
- List of largest mergers and acquisitions
- Lists of corporate acquisitions and mergers
