= Housejoy =

- Website type: Private
- Founded: 2014
- Headquarters: Bengaluru, Karnataka, India
- Area served: India
- CEO: Sanchit Gaurav
- Industry: Internet
- Website: www.housejoy.in

Housejoy is an Indian, Bengaluru-headquartered company that markets home construction, renovation, interior design, painting, maintenance, at-home beauty & salon services known as Zalon, packers & movers, home delivery of essential items known as Housejoymart, fumigation & sanitization service for homes and offices to mobile health checkup camps for general health & COVID testing known as Housejoycare.

== Controversy ==
In 2015, an article in Tech in Asia said that although the brand had been growing at a fast pace, it had difficulty in ensuring quality of services because of the highly unorganized services sector in India, wherein training of service providers had not been standardized. The brand also faced some problems in its onboarding process of not vetting service providers, which it was sending to customer's homes.

== Funding & Capitalisation ==
Housejoy received $4 million in Series A funding from Matrix Partners in June 2015. It then received another $23 million in Series B funding from Amazon, along with Matrix Partners, Qualcomm Ventures, ruNet, being the other participants in 2015.
