= Spool =

Spool may refer to:

- Spool (aeronautics), part of a jet engine
- Spool (record label), active 1998–2008
- Spool (software company), a social bookmarking company
- Bobbin, on which thread, yarn or wire is wound
- Cable reel, used to carry various types of electrical wires
- Emma Spool, a fictional character in the film Psycho II
- Jared Spool (born 1960), American tech writer
- Spooling, a form of multi-programming
- Spool pin, used in pin tumbler locks
- Winch
- Spool, a type of locking differential
