= Acqui-hiring =

Process of acquiring a company to recruit its employees

Acqui-hiring is the acquisition of startups or other small companies primarily to acquire human capital.

The term acqui-hire (a portmanteau of "acquisition" and "hire") was coined in 2005. The phenomenon gained widespread attention in the 2010s due to media coverage of tech firms, although acqui-hiring has been reported in a variety of industries. With acqui-hiring, the company is aiming to acquire not only talented individuals but a cohesive group of people that are productive jointly. The capital expenditure of purchasing may be more tax advantaged compared to employee poaching. Compared to other mergers and acquisitions, acqui-hires are smaller and faster. Acqui-hiring is most likely when talent is scarce. In acqui-hiring, the company's product is of at most secondary interest and is often killed shortly after the acquisition. The company usually tries to retain the employees and founder; the process of integration and retention is key to the success of the strategy. The benefits of these acquisitions compared to other forms of hiring is unclear.

== History ==
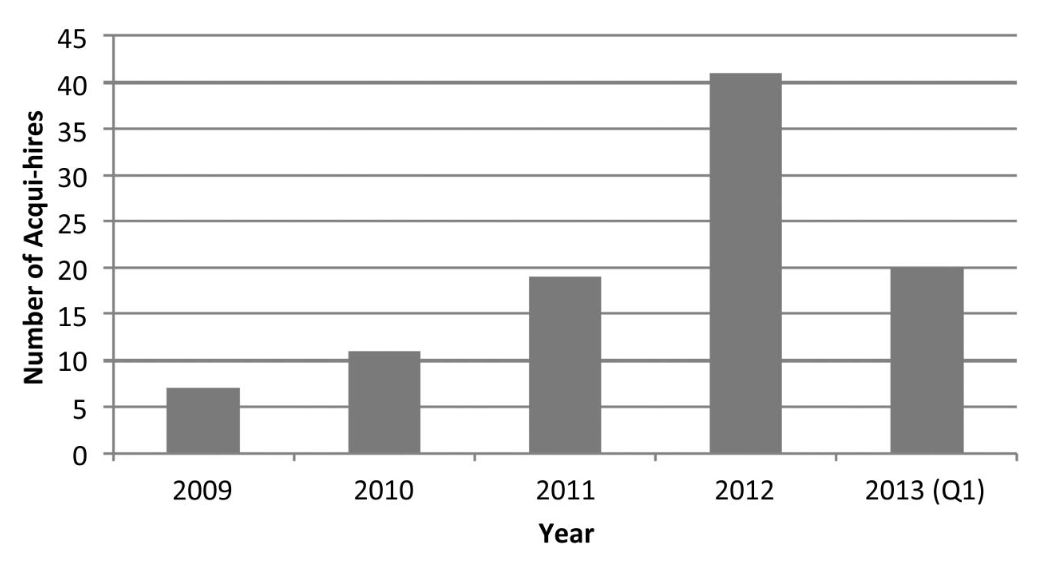
Acqui-hiring between 2009 and 2013

As early as 1985, the press discussed software companies merging in the context of acquiring developers. Ben Zimmer traced the derivation of the phrase "acqui-hire" to a blog post in May 2005. In the early 2010s, acqui-hiring attracted widespread media attention because of some high-profile acquisitions by large software companies such as Facebook, Microsoft, Twitter, and Google.

== Motivations ==
Although access to talented employees is one of the key factors driving the competitive advantage of companies, the best way to attract this human capital is a matter of debate. With acqui-hiring, the company is aiming to acquire not only talented individuals but a cohesive group of people that are productive jointly. Legal scholars John F. Coyle and Gregg D. Polsky do not consider team acquisition a sufficient explanation for acqui-hiring, because in some industries it is common to poach an entire team of employees at once. Acqui-hiring can scale more easily than traditional recruiting because multiple employees are hired at once. The expertise gained from acqui-hiring can help the company pivot to a new market sector and increase innovation in established firms.

Compared to other mergers and acquisitions, acqui-hires are smaller, faster, and involve startups that have not earned any revenue. The downside is the large capital expenditure required for acqui-hiring. It is more likely when talent is scarce in an industry.

On the side of entrepreneurs, motivations for accepting an acqui-hire include burnout and the fact that it appears more successful than alternatives such as liquidation if the company is not able to secure long-term success. Employees in the acquired company typically get a payout in stock that cannot be sold for a period of time. For investors in the acquired company, the deal may not be viewed favorably if they believe that there is collusion between the employees at the acquired firm and the acquiring firm to lower the purchase price in favor of higher employee compensation deals.

== Process ==
The first step in the process is identifying talent that the company needs and locating a startup to acqui-hire. The second step is buying the company when its value is lower, especially if the technology is in the trough stage of the hype cycle. The third step, crucial to the success of acqui-hiring, is integrating the new team and putting them to work.

Employees from acquired startups leave the company at a higher rate. If they leave, for such reasons as dissatisfaction with product cancellation or lack of autonomy within the new company, the acqui-hire will not be successful. Founders are more likely to leave if they do not receive a high-level position in the acquired company, or if the acquired team is broken up. Company culture differences between the startup and a more established company can be a significant barrier to the success of acqui-hiring.

In acqui-hiring, the company's product is of secondary interest and is often killed shortly after the acquisition. Often, the company was purchased both for its human capital and intellectual property such as patents, software, datasets, or trade secrets. For example, in 2017, Novartis acquired Advanced Accelerator Applications for about US$3.9 billion, gaining access to new cancer drugs in development as well as experts. Part of the motivation for acqui-hiring may be to remove potential competitors.

== Examples ==
It is difficult for researchers to determine the motivation for an acquisition if it was not reported in the media. A 2014 analysis of media reports found that Facebook, Google, Twitter, Zynga, Yahoo, and LinkedIn were the most prolific acqui-hirers, and that others included Palantir, Airbnb, and HubSpot. Acqui-hiring is particularly common in the software and services sectors. An estimated 50 percent of acquisitions by technology firms in 2011 and 2012 were possible acqui-hires. Acqui-hiring has been observed in a variety of sectors such as agriculture, consumer products, energy management, professional services, utility infrastructure, and warehousing.

=== Facebook ===
In 2010, Facebook CEO Mark Zuckerberg stated, "We have never once bought a company for the company. We buy companies for excellent people". One of Facebook's earliest acqui-hires was the seed-funded startup Parakey in 2007.

Chatterji separates Facebook's acqui-hires into:

- Strategic—to acquire the founder of the startup into a high-ranking role. Examples include Bret Taylor (FriendFeed, 2009), Gokul Rajaram (Chai Labs), Sam Lessin (Drop.io), and Peter Wilson (Rel8tion), which totaled over US$67 million. About these acquisitions, Zuckerberg stated that hiring entrepreneurs helped Facebook retain its start-up culture.
- Innovation—hiring to develop a new feature quickly. In 2010, Facebook bought Beluga messenger service. Within five months, it released Facebook Messenger to 750 million users.
- Product improvement—to enhance existing features.

=== Google ===
Google Glass was the product of acqui-hiring Neven Vision and DNN Research. Google obtained both patents and expertise from the acquisition of MicroOptical Corporation.

In 2017, Google acquired certain smartphone-related assets from HTC, including 4,000 employees that had worked for its design and research departments, and non-exclusive licenses to certain intellectual property. Google stated that the acquisition was intended for its Google Pixel hardware division; the talent acquired by Google included HTC employees who were previously contracted to co-develop the Pixel smartphone.

=== Apple ===
EditGrid was acqui-hired by Apple, Inc on 1 June 2008 for the iWork.com web applications development.

== Research ==
By 2014, the phenomenon had been discussed in the media but was not yet a subject of published academic research. The benefits of these acquisitions compared to other forms of hiring is unclear. Business researchers Kaushik Gala and Brandon A. Mueller argue that acqui-hires whose product was based on open-source technologies are more likely to be successful, because it is easier for the acquirer to evaluate the expertise of the engineers.

== Legal issues ==
Acqui-hiring may give rise to investor claims such as fraud, breach of fiduciary duties, fraudulent transfer, and successor liability. Such claims have led to shareholder derivative suits. In some jurisdictions, acqui-hiring might help firms bypass non-compete agreements, contractual terms of employment, and the protection of trade secrets with non-disclosure agreements, but these are largely inapplicable to startups in California. Depending on the jurisdiction, there may be a tax advantage of buying a company over poaching employees.

== Sources ==
- Boyacıoğlu, Beril; Özdemir, Mahmut N.; Karim, Samina (2024). "Acqui-hires: Redeployment and retention of human capital post-acquisition". Strategic Management Journal. 45 (2): 205–237. doi:10.1002/smj.3556. ISSN 0143-2095.
- Camuffo, Arnaldo; Stefano, Federica De (2019). "Getting access to strategic human capital resources: a multiple strategic factor market approach". Handbook of Research on Strategic Human Capital Resources. Edward Elgar Publishing. ISBN 978-1-78811-669-5.
- Chatterji, Aaron; Patro, Arun (2014). "Dynamic Capabilities and Managing Human Capital". Academy of Management Perspectives. 28 (4): 395–408. doi:10.5465/amp.2013.0111. ISSN 1558-9080.
- Chen, Jun; Hshieh, Shenje; Zhang, Feng (2023-07-19). "Hiring High-Skilled Labor Through Mergers and Acquisitions". Journal of Financial and Quantitative Analysis. 59 (6). Cambridge University Press (CUP): 2762–2798. doi:10.1017/s0022109023000856. hdl:2031/28fa6469-cc06-47fb-b721-8438a63933bf. ISSN 0022-1090.
- Coyle, John F.; Polsky, Greg D. (2012). "Acqui-Hiring". Duke Law Journal. 63: 281.
- Elfenbein, Daniel W.; Sterling, Adina D. (2018). "(When) Is Hiring Strategic? Human Capital Acquisition in the Age of Algorithms". Strategy Science. 3 (4): 668–682. doi:10.1287/stsc.2018.0072. ISSN 2333-2050.
- Fantasia, Roberta (2016). "Acquihiring: A New Process for Innovation and Organizational Learning". Information and Communication Technologies in Organizations and Society. Lecture Notes in Information Systems and Organisation. Vol. 15. Cham: Springer International Publishing. pp. 205–214. doi:10.1007/978-3-319-28907-6_13. ISBN 978-3-319-28906-9.
- Gala, Kaushik; Mueller, Brandon A. (2024-05-03). "Acquihires by SMEs as a strategic response to industry digitalization". Journal of Small Business Management. 62 (3): 1430–1468. doi:10.1080/00472778.2022.2140161. ISSN 0047-2778.
- Kehoe, Rebecca R.; Brymer, Rhett Andrew; Keller, Jr; Kim, Joonyoung (2024). "Hiring by professional affiliation: The benefits and challenges of leveraging prospective hires' prior employment ties to improve matching and access to resources". Personnel Psychology. 77 (2): 497–526. doi:10.1111/peps.12553. hdl:1813/114258. ISSN 0031-5826.
- Kim, J. Daniel (2023-11-17). "Startup Acquisitions as a Hiring Strategy: Turnover Differences Between Acquired and Regular Hires". Strategy Science. 9 (2): 118–134. doi:10.1287/stsc.2022.0026. ISSN 2333-2050.
- Ng, Weiyi; Stuart, Toby E. (2022). "Acquired employees versus hired employees: Retained or turned over?". Strategic Management Journal. 43 (5): 1025–1045. doi:10.1002/smj.3361. ISSN 0143-2095.
- Nolan, Samantha (2015). "Talent for Sale: The Need for Enhanced Scrutiny in Judicial Evaluation of Acqui-Hires". Hastings Law Journal. 67: 849.
