= VMI =

VMI may refer to:

== Science and technology ==
- Virtual mobile infrastructure, hosting a nominally mobile operating system in a data center or cloud
- Velocity Map Imaging, a technique in photofragment-ion imaging in chemical physics
- Virtual machine image, an exact snapshot of a computer disk in a virtual machine

== Organizations ==
- State Tax Inspectorate, a Lithuanian tax authority
- Virginia Military Institute, America's oldest state-supported and only all-military college, located in Lexington, Virginia
  - United States v. Virginia ("the VMI decision"), a 1996 US Supreme Court case which struck down VMI's male-only admission policy
- Virginia Mason Institute, part of the Virginia Mason Medical Center hospital system
- Vermont Microsystems, Inc., a defunct American computer hardware company

== Other uses ==
- Vendor-managed inventory, where a product supplier maintains an inventory of material, typically at the buyer's location
