= Lightbox (disambiguation) =

A lightbox is a translucent surface illuminated from behind.

Lightbox may also refer to:

== Media and entertainment ==
- Lightbox (production company), a British production company
- Lightbox.com, a discontinued photoblogging platform
- LightBox Interactive, a USA-based video game developer
- Lightbox (New Zealand), an online TV show streaming service
- Time LightBox, a blog by the photo department of Time Magazine
- Lightbox (album), a 2014 album by Chris Letchford
- The Lightbox, a gallery in Woking, England
- TIFF Bell Lightbox, the headquarters for the Toronto International Film Festival in Toronto
- LightBox Expo, an animation convention in Los Angeles, California co-founded by Jim Demonakos in 2019

== Other uses ==
- Lightbox (JavaScript), a particular JavaScript technique that displays images in a browser using modal dialogs
- Light box, an artificial sunlight source used in light therapy

== See also ==
- Light table
