= Workvivo (software) =

Online collaborative software

== History ==
Workvivo
- Website type: Enterprise collaboration
- Area served: Worldwide
- Owner: Zoom Communications
- Founders: John Goulding; Joe Lennon
- Industry: Internet
- Website: www.workvivo.com
- Launched: 2017

Workvivo by Zoom, is an enterprise employee experience platform and AI native intranet by Zoom Communications. Workvivo was founded in 2017 in Cork, Ireland by John Goulding and Joe Lennon who previously worked together on CoreHR. The company got initial seed funding from Zoom founder Eric Yuan. In 2020, Workvivo raised €14.7 million in a Series A round lead by Tiger Global and was acquired by Zoom in April 2023. It was selected as the preferred migration partner for Meta Platforms' Workplace from Meta. Workvivo grew its revenue by 174% to €69.39 million in 2024.

== See also ==
- List of collaborative software
