= Dynamic Signal =

Technology company

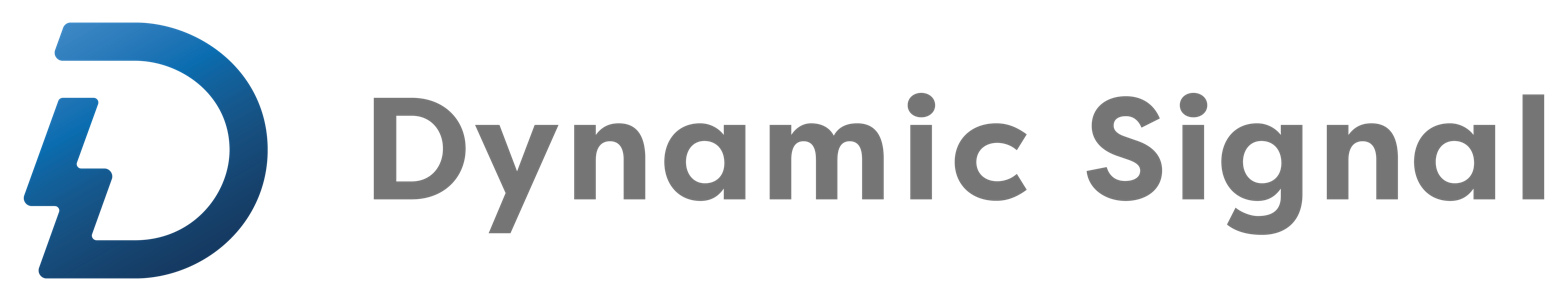
- Type: Private
- Industry: Employee Communication and Engagement Platform
- Founded: November 2010
- Founders: Russ Fradin, Jim Larrison, Steve Heyman
- Headquarters: San Bruno, California
- Key people: Eric Brown, CEO
- Products: Dynamic Signal
- Services: employee communication, employee engagement
- Number of employees: 170
- Website: dynamicsignal.com

Dynamic Signal was a technology company, offering a mobile-first company communications platform, based in San Bruno, California. Russ Fradin, Steve Heyman and Jim Larrison founded the company in 2010. Fradin is the Chairman of the Board of Dynamic Signal. while Eric Brown is CEO. Dynamic Signal merged with SocialChorus in 2021 to form Firstup.

== History ==
In November 2010, Russ Fradin, Steve Heyman and Jim Larrison founded Dynamic Signal. They previously worked for Adify, an advertising infrastructure company. In February 2011, Dynamic Signal raised $8 million in equity-based financing from a group of 30 investors. That July, Business Insider included Dynamic Signal on its list of "The 20 Hot Silicon Valley Startups You Need To Watch." The company closed a $13.3 million funding round led by Venrock in July 2012. Time Warner, Trinity Ventures and Cox Enterprises also participated. In March 2013, the company announced VoiceStorm, a product that manages and measures employees' efforts to promote a company on social networks. That November, Intel partnered with Dynamic Signal.

Dynamic Signal released an iOS application for VoiceStorm in February 2014. In August 2014, the company closed a $12 million funding round led by Rembrandt Venture and participation from Venrock, Trinity Ventures, Time Warner Ventures and Cox Enterprises. Some of the funds were used to acquire PaperShare, a content marketing start-up based in Washington.

In December 2016, Dynamic Signal raised $25 million in growth financing. Participants in this round included new investors, Akkadian Ventures, Microsoft Ventures and Focus Opportunity Fund in addition to participation by existing investors, Trinity Ventures, Venrock, Rembrandt, and Time Warner. Dynamic Signal used the newly acquired funds to expand its international operations.

== Operations ==
Dynamic Signal was headquartered in San Bruno, California. The company had delivered impressions for brands such as Hitachi Data Systems, Salesforce, Deloitte and GameStop. According to a company press release in May 2017, Dynamic Signal was then servicing "nearly 20 percent of the Fortune 500, and 20 percent of the Fortune 50".

== Product ==
Dynamic Signal marketed what it describes as an "Employee Communication and Engagement Platform" to communications, HR, and marketing professionals. The platform is intended to enable communications for both internal company news and information, as well as industry content that can be "distributed and tracked through employees' own social channels". Since the merger in 2021, it now continues as a workforce communication platform known as "Firstup".
