= Shandong University of Science and Technology =

Public University in Shandong, China

Coordinates: 36°0′3″N 120°7′30″E

- 山东科技大学
- Motto: 惟真求新
- Motto in English: Truth and Innovation
- Type: Public
- Established: 1951
- Academic staff: 2,900
- Students: around 46,000
- Postgraduates: 5,900
- Location: Qingdao, Tai'an and Jinan, Shandong, China
- Nickname: Wuthering Heights
- Website: sdust.edu.cn

The Shandong University of Science and Technology (SDUST; 山东科技大学) is a provincial public university in Qingdao, Shandong, China. It is affiliated with the Province of Shandong and funded by the provincial government. It was established in 1951. The university offers courses in science and technology.

== Campus ==
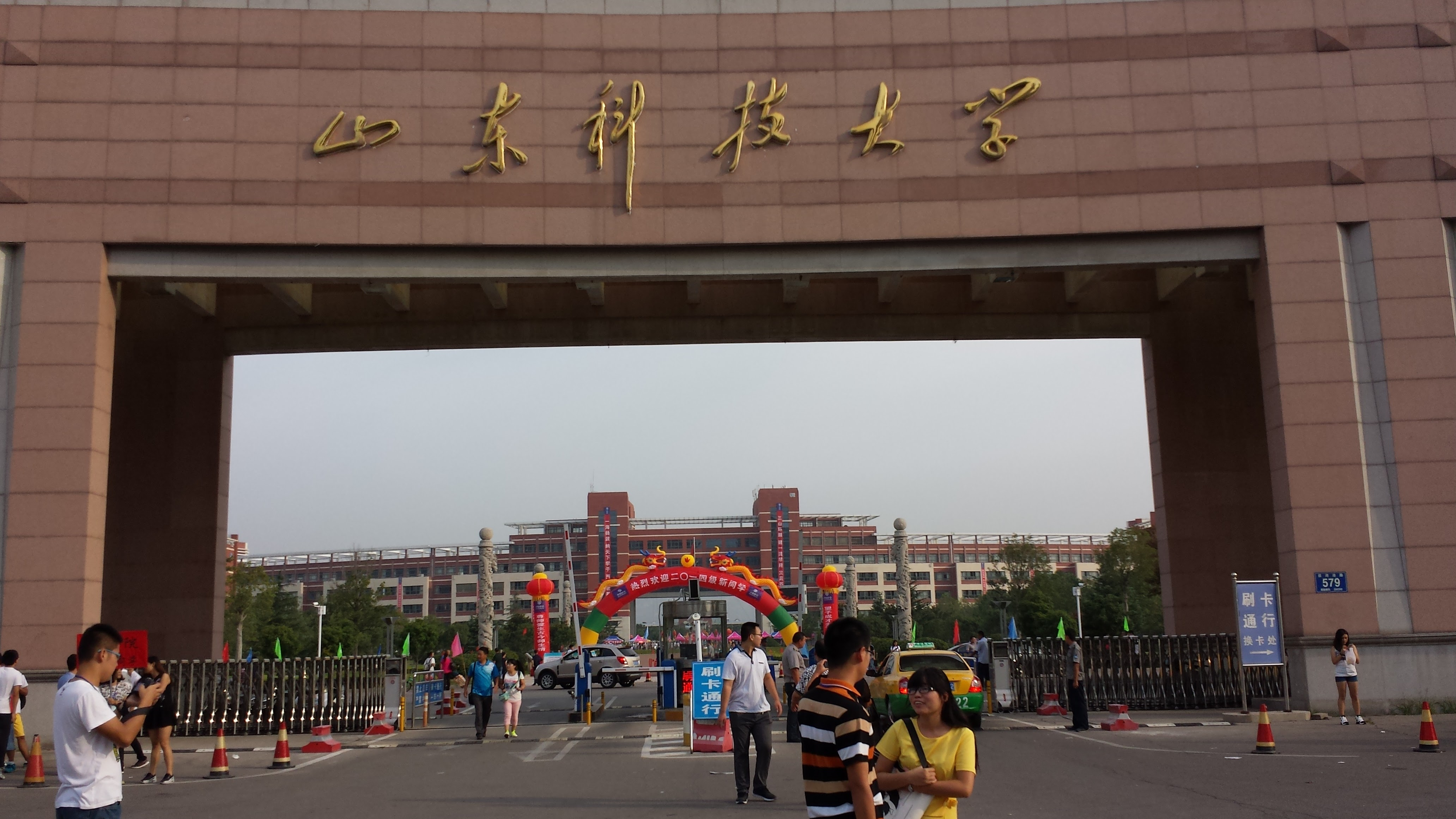
Campus in Qingdao

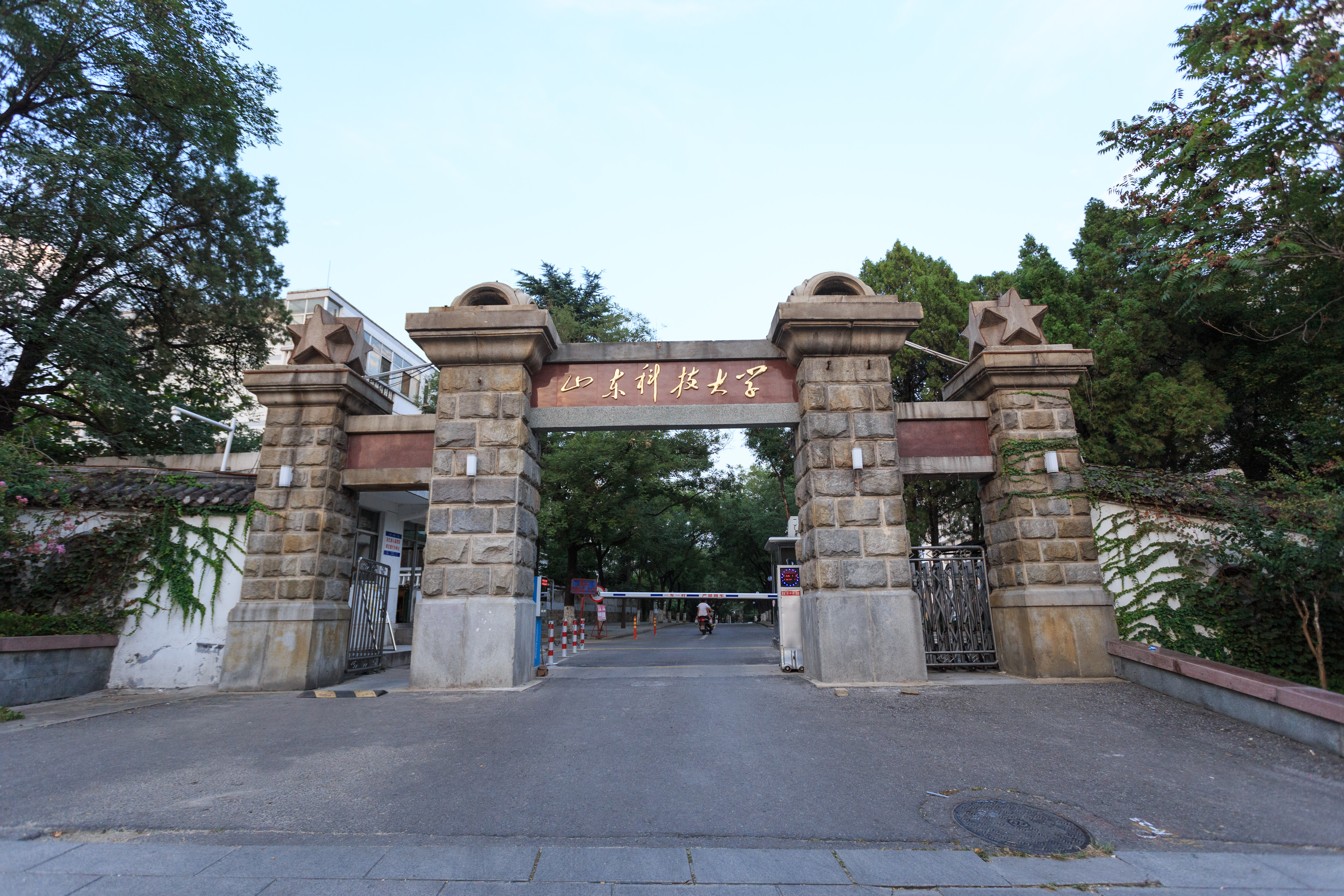
Campus in Tai'an

The university's main campus is in Qingdao since 2003. It has regional campuses in Tai'an and Jinan. The total area of the university is 243.16 hectares with a floor space of 1.35 million square meters. More than 44,600 students were enrolled in 2010.

== Administration ==
=== Departmental structure ===
- President Office
- International Office
- Department of Academic Affairs
- Department of Scientific Research
- Department of Student Affairs
- Department of Human Resource
- Department of Finance
- Department of Assets Management
- School of Graduate
- General Scientific Corporation

=== Faculty structure ===
The Shandong University of Science and Technology is made up of sixteen academic colleges, nine departments and one independent college. There are five postdoctoral research stations, three level-1 doctoral programs with 24 disciplines conferring doctor's degrees, seven disciplines with Taishan Scholar professors of Shandong province, twelve level-1 master's degree programs with 77 disciplines conferring master's degrees, fourteen domains conferring Master of Engineering degrees, and 72 undergraduate programs.

It has one state key discipline, 27 key disciplines (laboratories), one provincial research base for humanities and social sciences, one Qingdao City key laboratory, one engineering research center of the Ministry of Education, seven provincial research centers of engineering and technology.

There is a professional center with an approval of the National Manufacturing Information Training Center, a foreign language training center under the State Administration of Foreign Experts Affairs, Shandong—Russia Center of Scientific Cooperation, and the Qingdao Manufacturing Information Personnel Cultivation Base. The Russian Academy of Natural Sciences set up a China Science Center at the university.

- College of Natural Resources and Environmental Engineering
- College of Geosciences and Technology
- College of Civil Engineering and Architecture
- College of Mechanical and Electronic Engineering
- College of Computer Science and Engineering
- College of Economics and Management
- College of Information and Electrical Engineering
- College of Chemical and Environmental Engineering
- College of Materials Science and Engineering
- College of Humanities and Law
- College of Foreign Languages
- College of Science
- College of Continuing Education
- Taishan College of Science and Technology
- College of Geomatics
- College of Arts and Design

== Notable alumni ==
- Eric Yuan – Founder and CEO of Zoom Video Communications.
