= MyPoolin =

Mypoolin
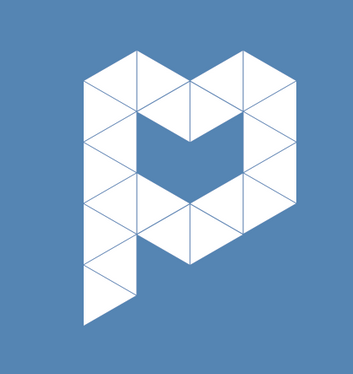
- Type: Private
- Industry: Mobile payment
- Founded: 17 August 2014
- Founders: Ankit Singh; Rohit Taneja
- Headquarters: Investopad, Sector 32 Gurgaon, Haryana 122018, India
- Area served: India
- Website: mypoolin.com

Mypoolin is a mobile peer-to-peer and group payment application. Their software allows the settling of debts and group-expenditure for events and activities.

The software utilizes Unified Payment Interface of India to collect and settle daily expenses with friends. Users can also plan and pay together for group-gifting, movies, vacations, concerts, events, and parties.

== Service ==
Mypoolin is a mobile payment provider that lets its users transfer money to other users via their mobile number. A user can create an account by verifying an OTP code which is sent to his mobile phone. It also allows the users to track their friends’ activities on the app.

== History ==
Mypoolin was founded by Rohit Taneja (IIT Delhi) and Ankit Singh (FMS Delhi) in 2014 as a medium to aggregate money for various purposes. Prior to the mobile app launch, Mypoolin was initially launched as a web application.

== Funding ==
Mypoolin has been seed funded by angel investors. As winners of the QPrize 2015, Mypoolin jointly received an additional funding of $250,000 from Qualcomm Ventures.

== Growth ==
Mypoolin reached INR 10 lakhs in revenue during its first four months of the web application launch, and was listed in the "Top ten free apps" in its category within the first 5 days of the Android app launch. It was one of the Top 50 start-ups in Asia at the Echelon Asia Summit held in Singapore. And among the top 3 start-ups in 1776 Cup Challenge 2016. Apple Inc also featured the app on their app store in India.

== Features ==
Users are able to collect and share money on the app for daily uses like movies, events and trips. The money collected can then be redeemed in the form of an online voucher redeemable across several e-commerce sites. The amount can be redeemed also in the form of an offline debit card delivered to the address or in the form of a wire transfer.

== Media coverage ==
Mypoolin was featured in The Economic Times and The Hindu Business Line after winning the Qualcomm Ventures' QPrize 2015.

Digit magazine featured them recently as the app of the week. The app has mostly grown organically so far in the Indian urban millennial space.
