= Bloginity =

Bloginity Networks LLC
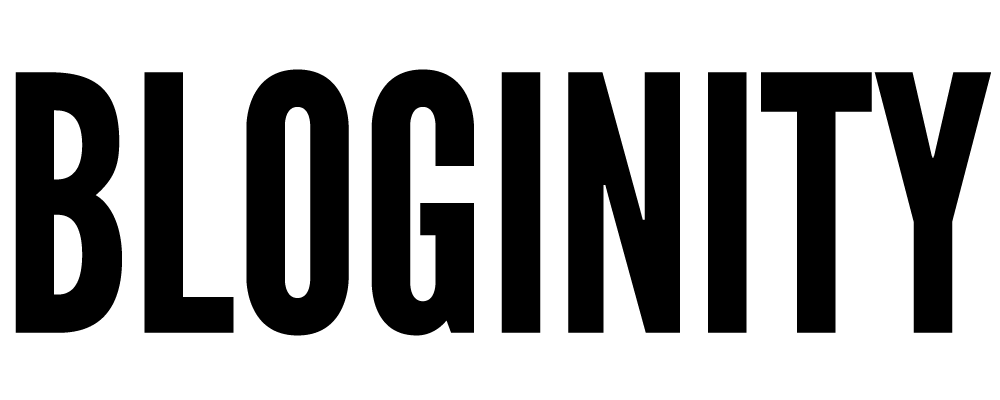
- Company type: Private
- Website type: News & online magazine
- Available in: English
- Founded: August 2008; 18 years ago
- Website: www.bloginity.com
- Registration: Optional

Bloginity is an online network of creative professionals that discover and document individuals within the fashion and art industry. Bloginity.com comprises a number of websites with various areas of coverage. The company was founded in 2008 and is privately held.

== Website ==
The flagship site of Bloginity Networks is Bloginity.com, an online magazine. The site was founded in August 2008 and covers fashion, photography, arts and culture and a variety of other topics. The site often publishes exclusive interviews.

Bloginity.com is one of the 35 websites that are showcased under the News category at the WordPress showcase gallery. It is listed among websites such as Times.com, TechCrunch.com, Yahoo! News and Anderson Cooper 360°. It is also ranked as one of the highest rated WordPress Websites according to WordPress.org. The site is also ranked on Top 100 Fashion Sites according to Technorati and has been named #76 Most Influential Fashion & Beauty Blogs of 2011, and #85 in 2012 by Signature9. In January 2013, Bloginity collaborated with Google for the Google+ New York Fashion Week project.

Bloginity's interviews have featured musicians, artists, directors, photographers and comedians including Rob Huebel, Luis Morais, Millionaire Matchmaker, Bruno Mars, Audrina Patridge, The Black Eyed Peas, Bobby V, Jake Gyllenhaal, Deftones, Mike Posner, Titiyo, Taylor Momsen, Andreas Kleerup, Beth Rowley, Brett Dennen, Yelle, Miley Cyrus and Marina & the Diamonds.

== Recognition ==
Bloginity.com has received recognition from WordPress.org who featured the site in its showcase, noting the site's developers constantly tweak colors, positions, fonts and other things to optimize bounce rates and lifetime value of users. AllMyFaves named Bloginity as "One of the Web's Best Entertainment Spots" noting It’s classy in all possible aspects: design, content, diversified story topics, quality and variety of photos and videos.

Bloginity has been used as a source by prominent online news outlets, such as Yahoo! BBC News AZCentral, IGN, and Comedy Central.

The magazine also syndicates its news to SnapTu, Pulse, Bing News, Google News IMDb Us Magazine, and Forbes.

== Research ==
In August 2010, Bloginity Networks conducted a survey of 1,050 American adults and found that 56 percent of respondents preferred to read about celebrity crime more than any other type of celebrity scandal, including those involving celebrities going to rehab or making and distributing sex tapes.
