= Firstup =

American multinational software company

Firstup, Inc.
- Type: Private
- Industry: Software
- Founded: 2008; 18 years ago
- Founders: Greg Shove, Nicole Alvino
- Headquarters: San Francisco, California, United States
- Areas served: Worldwide
- Key people: Nicole Alvino (Co-Founder & Chairwoman of the Board); Bill Schuh (CEO)
- Products: Firstup
- Number of employees: 300
- Website: Firstup.io

Firstup, Inc. is an American multinational software company headquartered in San Francisco, California, that designs, develops and sells workforce communications software. Its platform helps large companies manage communications with employees and partners. Greg Shove and Nicole Alvino founded the company, as SocialChorus, in 2008. As of 2025, Bill Schuh is CEO of Firstup.

== History ==
=== 2008–2013: Founding and early years ===
Greg Shove and Nicole Alvino met at Stanford Graduate School of Business, where Shove was an advisor in one of Alvino's classes. They formed SocialChorus in 2008. In its early years, the company operated as Halogen Media Group and focused on helping companies run online marketing campaigns. It grew following a Series A round of financing from Kohlberg Ventures in 2009, and in 2011 the company renamed to SocialChorus following a merger with influencer management platform YouCast.

Blogs and social media platforms like Facebook and Twitter were emerging into mainstream culture at the time and large companies were beginning to communicate product releases, company news and promotions with bloggers, customers and employees who expressed an interest in talking about their products and services online. SocialChorus built a platform that helped companies run and measure these advocate marketing campaigns at a larger scale. Early clients included AT&T, Toyota and Peet's Coffee, and in 2013 the company secured $2.5 Million in Series A funding from existing investor Kohlberg Ventures and a new investor, Windforce Ventures.

=== 2013–2016: Evolution into employee advocacy ===
The SocialChorus platform was originally built to help companies engage with influential consumers but AT&T, one of the earliest users of SocialChorus, found that its own employees were interested in talking about the company online. AT&T used SocialChorus to form an employee social media advocacy program called AT&T Social Circle. Thousands of AT&T employees connected their personal social media accounts to the platform to receive company information and publish it out to their own friends, family members and professional networks. Interest in this new model of tapping employees as brand ambassadors grew, prompting SocialChorus to focus its platform on helping companies scale employee advocacy programs. Kohlberg Ventures led additional rounds of funding in 2014 and 2016.

=== 2016–present: Growth into workforce communications platform ===
By the mid 2010s, large companies had amassed a range of disparate tools to communicate with their employees—from digital signage in office hallways to internal email newsletters, intranets and internal social networks and chat tools. As companies took on digital transformation projects and started to place more emphasis on employee communications, SocialChorus evolved its product into a workforce communications platform designed to align communications across these disparate internal channels. TechCrunch described it as a "platform to help organizations coordinate and communicate better with their employees." It raised an additional $12.5 million in 2018 to fund development of integrations with SharePoint, Slack and Workplace, as well as expansion into Europe, Middle East and Africa with an additional office opened in London.
