= Zoom Communications =

American video communications company

Zoom Communications, Inc.

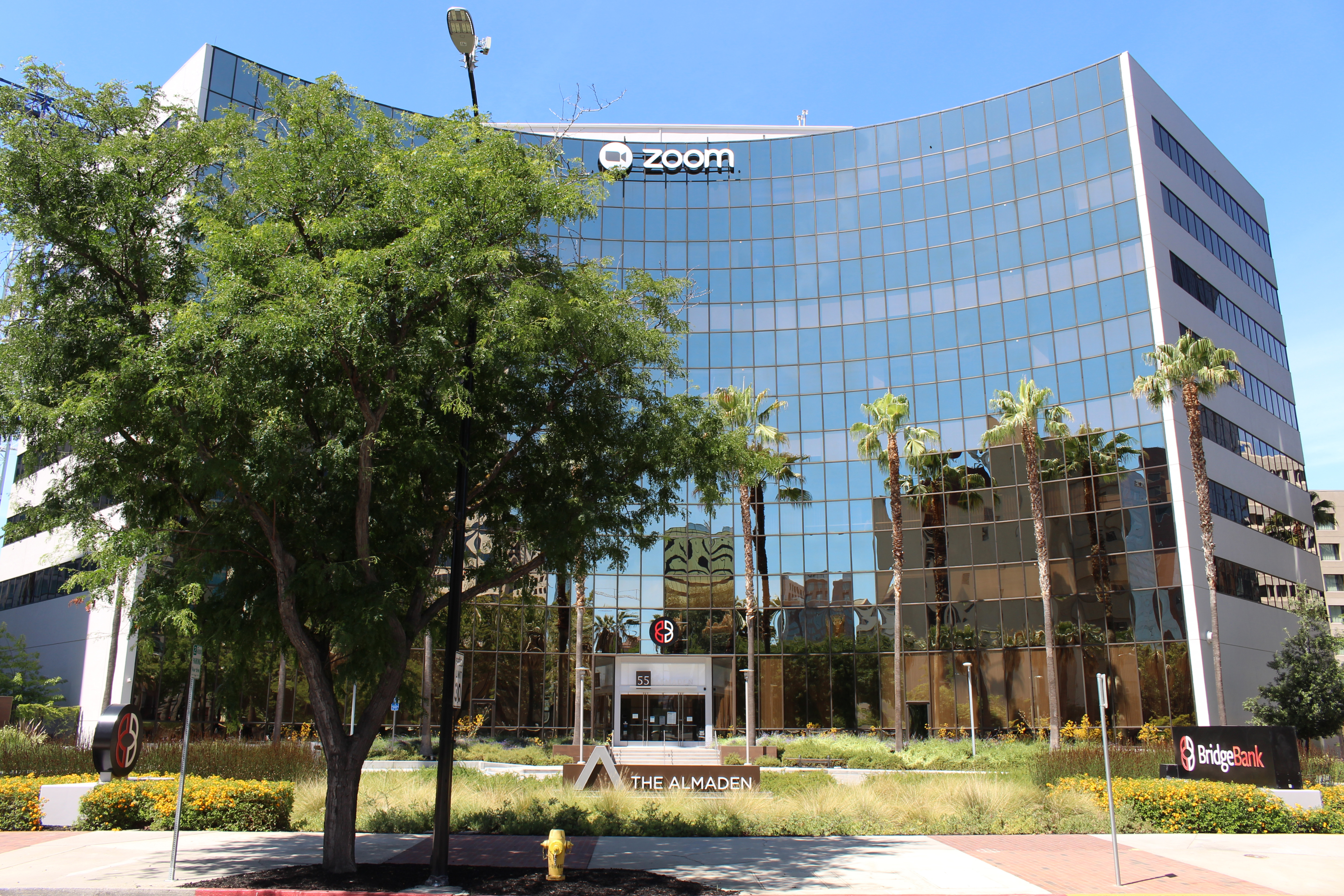
- Headquarters in Downtown San Jose
- Formerly: Saasbee, Inc. (2011–2012); Zoom Video Communications, Inc. (2012–2024)
- Type: Public
- Traded as: Nasdaq: ZM (Class A); Russell 1000 component
- Founded: April 21, 2011; 15 years ago
- Founder: Eric Yuan
- Headquarters: San Jose, California, U.S.
- Area served: Worldwide
- Key people: Eric Yuan (chairman and CEO); Xuedong Huang (CTO)
- Products: Zoom
- Services: Videotelephony; Online chat; Business telephone systems
- Revenue: ▲US$4.67 billion (2025)
- Operating income: ▲US$813 million (2025)
- Net income: ▲US$1.01 billion (2025)
- Total assets: ▲US$11.0 billion (2025)
- Total equity: ▲US$8.96 billion (2025)
- Number of employees: 7,412 (2025)
- Website: zoom.com
- Footnotes; Financials as of January 31, 2025.

Zoom Communications, Inc. (formerly Zoom Video Communications, Inc., commonly shortened to Zoom, and stylized as zoom) is an American communications technology company headquartered in San Jose, California, United States. It is primarily known for the videoconferencing platform Zoom.

The company was founded in 2011 by Eric Yuan, a former Cisco engineer and executive. He launched its software in 2013. Its software products have faced public and media scrutiny related to security and privacy issues, though the company has taken measures to address these issues.

== History ==
=== Early years ===
Former logo (2014-2022)

Zoom was founded by Eric Yuan, a former corporate vice president for Cisco Webex. He left Cisco in April 2011 with 40 engineers to start a new company, originally named Saasbee, Inc. The company had trouble finding investors because many people thought the videotelephony market was already saturated. In June 2011, the company raised $3 million of seed money from WebEx founder Subrah Iyar, former Cisco SVP and General Counsel Dan Scheinman, and venture capitalists Matt Ocko, TSVC, and Bill Tai.

In May 2012, the company changed its name to Zoom, influenced by Thacher Hurd's children's book Zoom City. In September 2012, Zoom launched a beta version that could host conferences with up to 15 video participants. In November 2012, the company signed Stanford University as its first customer. The service was launched in January 2013 after the company raised a $6 million Series A round from Qualcomm Ventures, Yahoo! founder Jerry Yang, WebEx founder Subrah Iyar, and former Cisco SVP and General Counsel Dan Scheinman. Zoom launched version 1.0 of the program allowing the maximum number of participants per conference to be 25. By the end of its first month, Zoom had 400,000 users and by May 2013 it had 1 million users.

=== Growth ===
In July 2013, Zoom established partnerships with B2B collaboration software providers, such as Redbooth (then Teambox), and also created a program named Works with Zoom, which established partnerships with Logitech, Vaddio, and InFocus. In September 2013, the company raised $6.5 million in a Series B round from Horizon Ventures, and existing investors. At that time, it had 3 million daily meeting participants.

On February 4, 2015, the company received US$30 million in Series C funding from investors including Emergence Capital, Horizons Ventures (Li Ka-shing), Qualcomm Ventures, Jerry Yang, and Patrick Soon-Shiong. At that time, Zoom had 40 million users, with 65,000 organizations subscribed and a total of 1 billion meeting minutes since it was established. Over the course of 2015 and 2016, the company integrated its software with Slack, Salesforce, and Skype for Business. With version 2.5 in October 2015, Zoom increased the maximum number of participants allowed per conference to 50 and later to 1,000 for business customers. In November 2015, former president of RingCentral David Berman was named president of the company, and Peter Gassner, the founder and CEO of Veeva Systems, joined Zoom's board of directors.

In January 2017, the company raised US$100 million in Series D funding from Sequoia Capital at a US$1 billion valuation, making it a unicorn. In April 2017, Zoom launched a scalable telehealth product allowing doctors to host remote consultations with patients. In May, Zoom announced integration with Polycom's conferencing systems, enabling features such as multiple screen and device meetings, HD and wireless screen sharing, and calendar integration with Microsoft Outlook, Google Calendar, and iCal. From September 25–27, 2017, Zoom hosted Zoomtopia 2017, its first annual user conference. At this conference, Zoom announced a partnership with Meta Platforms to integrate Zoom with augmented reality, integration with Slack and Workplace by Facebook, and first steps towards an artificial intelligence (AI) speech recognition program.

=== IPO and onward ===
On April 18, 2019, the company became a public company via an initial public offering; since then, it has been listed on Nasdaq under the ticker symbol ZM. After pricing at US$36 per share, the share price increased over 72% on the first day of trading. Prior to the IPO, Dropbox invested $5 million in Zoom. The company first became profitable in 2019.

Due to the increase in remote work, distance education, and remote social relations during the COVID-19 pandemic, usage increased substantially and the Zoom mobile app was the 5th most downloaded mobile app in 2020, behind TikTok, WhatsApp, Facebook, and Instagram. The company offered its services free to K–12 schools in many countries. On April 30, the company joined the Nasdaq-100 stock index. The next month, Zoom acquired Keybase, a company specializing in end-to-end encryption, and in June, the company hired its first chief diversity officer, Damien Hooper-Campbell.

Zoom announced its first hardware as a service products in July 2020, bundling its videoconferencing software with third-party hardware by DTEN, Neat, Poly, and Yealink, and running on the ServiceNow platform. It began with Zoom Rooms and Zoom Phone offerings, with those services available to US customers, who can acquire hardware from Zoom for a fixed monthly cost. On July 15, 2020, the company announced Zoom for Home, a line of products for home use, designed for remote workers. The first product, Zoom for Home - DTEN ME, includes software by Zoom and hardware by DTEN. It consists of a 27-inch screen with three wide-angle cameras and eight microphones, with Zoom software preloaded on the device. It became available in August 2020.

In June 2021, Zoom acquired Kites (Karlsruhe Information Technology Solutions), an artificial intelligence-based language translation company with an aim to reduce language barriers in video calls. Zoom's attempt to acquire contact center company Five9 for $14.7 billion in September of that year was turned down by Five9's shareholders.

Zoom announced that it would cut its workforce by 15 percent, or about 1,300 employees, in February 2023, citing unsustainable growth following rapid scaling to manage the demand of the pandemic. Zoom then acquired Workvivo in April to extend the Zoom platform. Zoom dropped out of the Nasdaq-100 in December.

In November 2024, Zoom Video Communications, Inc. rebranded as Zoom Communications, Inc., dropping 'Video' from its name, to reflect a change towards what CEO Eric Yuan described as "[an] AI-first work platform for human connection". Zoom announced the acquisition of the AI-powered hiring platform BrightHire for an undisclosed amount a year later.

In April 2026, Zoom Communications partnered with Tools for Humanity to integrate World ID's biometric human-verification technology into its Zoom Meetings product, aimed at helping enterprises counter AI-generated deepfake impersonation.

== Privacy and security issues ==
Zoom has been criticized for "security lapses and poor design choices" that have resulted in heightened scrutiny of its software. The company has also been criticized for its privacy and corporate data sharing policies. Security researchers and reporters have criticized the company for its lack of transparency and poor encryption practices. Zoom initially claimed to use "end-to-end encryption" in its marketing materials, but later clarified it meant "from Zoom end point to Zoom end point" (meaning effectively between Zoom servers and Zoom clients), which The Intercept described as misleading and "dishonest".

In March 2020, New York State Attorney General Letitia James launched an inquiry into Zoom's privacy and security practices; the inquiry was closed on May 7, 2020, with Zoom not admitting wrongdoing, but agreeing to take added security measures. In the same month, a class-action lawsuit against Zoom was filed in the United States District Court for the Northern District of California. According to the lawsuit, Zoom violated the privacy of its users by sharing personal data with Facebook, Google, and LinkedIn, did not prevent hackers from disrupting Zoom sessions, and erroneously claimed to offer end-to-end encryption on Zoom sessions. Zoom settled this lawsuit for $86 million.

On April 1, 2020, Zoom announced a 90-day freeze on releasing new features, to focus on fixing privacy and security issues on Zoom. On July 1, 2020, Yuan wrote a blog post detailing efforts taken by the company to address security and privacy concerns, stating that they released 100 new safety features over the 90-day period. Those efforts include end-to-end encryption for all users, turning on meeting passwords by default, giving users the ability to choose which data centers calls are routed from, consulting with security experts, forming a CISO council, an improved bug bounty program, and working with third parties to help test security. Yuan also stated that Zoom would be releasing a transparency report later in 2020.

In May 2020, the Federal Trade Commission (FTC) announced that it was looking into Zoom's privacy practices. The FTC alleged that since at least 2016, "Zoom maintained the cryptographic keys that could allow Zoom to access the content of its customers' meetings, and secured its Zoom Meetings, in part, with a lower level of encryption than promised." On November 9, 2020, a settlement was reached, requiring the company to implement additional security measures.

In December 2020, Zoom announced that it was under investigation by the U.S. Securities and Exchange Commission (SEC) and the United States Attorney for the Northern District of California and that it had received a subpoena in June 2020 from the United States Attorney for the Eastern District of New York requesting information on the company's interactions with foreign governments and political parties. Both federal prosecutors also sought information and documentation about security and privacy matters regarding Zoom's practices.

On December 19, 2020, a former Zoom executive was charged by the U.S. Department of Justice with conspiracy to commit interstate harassment and unlawful conspiracy to transfer a means of identification. The charges are related to the alleged disruptions to video meetings commemorating the 1989 Tiananmen Square protests and massacre. Federal prosecutors in Brooklyn, New York, said that Xinjiang "Julien" Jin, then 39, was a San Jose, California–based company's main liaison with intelligence and law enforcement agencies of China. Zoom later acknowledged it was the company in question. It said in a statement that it had terminated Jin's employment for violating company policies and was cooperating with the prosecutors. Jin is not in custody because he is based in China.

In February 2021, Zoom announced a new feature called Kiosk Mode, which will allow people visiting offices to check in with a receptionist virtually on a kiosk, without any physical contact. A month later, Zoom announced that from August 23, 2021, Zoom would stop selling new and upgraded products directly to customers in mainland China. Zoom agreed to pay $85 million to settle a class action lawsuit over the company's alleged sharing of data with Facebook, Linkedin, and Google that year.

== Censorship ==
In April 2020, the Citizen Lab warned that having much of Zoom's research and development in China could "open up Zoom to pressure from Chinese authorities." In June 2020, Zoom was criticized for closing multiple accounts of U.S. and Hong Kong–based groups, including that of Zhou Fengsuo and two other human rights activists, who were commemorating the 1989 Tiananmen Square protests and massacre. The accounts were later re-opened, with the company stating that in the future it "will have a new process for handling similar situations." Zoom responded that it has to "comply with local laws," even "the laws of governments opposed to free speech." Zoom subsequently admitted to shutting down activist accounts at the request of the Chinese government. In response, a bi-partisan group of U.S. senators requested clarification of the incident from the company. Partially in response to criticisms of its blocking of the activists accounts as well as expressions of concern by the United States Justice Department, Zoom moved to cease direct sale of its product in mainland China in late August 2020.

In September 2020, following protests and legal concerns raised by the Jewish coalition group #EndJewHatred, Zoom prevented the San Francisco State University from using its video conferencing software to host former Palestinian militant and hijacker Leila Khaled, a member of the Popular Front for the Liberation of Palestine (PFLP). In justifying its decision, Zoom cited the PFLP's designation as a terrorist organization by the United States Government and its efforts to comply with U.S. export control, sanctions, and anti-terrorism laws. Facebook and YouTube also joined Zoom in denying their platforms to the conference organizers. Professor Rabab Ibrahim Abdulhadi, one of the conference organizers, criticized Zoom, Google's YouTube, and Meta's Facebook for censoring Palestinian voices.

== See also ==
- Collaborative software
- Comparison of web conferencing software
- List of video telecommunication services and product brands
- Impact of the COVID-19 pandemic on science and technology
