= Santanu Bhattacharya (data scientist) =

Data Scientist

- Born: Northeast India
- Citizenship: American
- Education: IIT Bombay; MIT Sloan; NASA Goddard Space Flight Center; University of Maryland
- Occupations: Scientist at Camera Culture Group MIT Media Lab; Visiting professor at Indian Institute of Science

Santanu Bhattacharya is an American data scientist. Currently, at the Camera Culture Group, MIT Media Lab. He is a serial entrepreneur and has worked for NASA and Facebook in the past. He has been a C-level executive at Fortune1000 corporations such as Airtel and Facebook and is a former visiting professor at the Indian Institute of Science.

== Early life ==
Santanu was born in the remote sub-Himalayan part of Northeast India. After graduating high-school, he studied at Indian Institute of Technology Bombay before moving to the United States for graduate school.

== Career ==
Santanu received his PhD from University of Maryland, College Park and NASA Goddard Space Flight Center where he conducted pathbreaking research on a new class of superconducting infrared detectors.

Following his doctorate, Bhattacharya pursued an entrepreneurial and industrial path in data and automation. Following his entrepreneurial debut at OriginLab, based in Northampton, Massachusetts he led Laboratory Information Management System (LIMS) product development at Beckman Instruments (now Beckman Coulter) and subsequently joined A.T. Kearney, the renowned management consulting firm, in New York, working with clients such as Gillette, Pepsi, BMW and Goldman Sachs.

In 2004 he joined America Online (AOL), where he served as Founding Director of the Analytics Solution Centre, a global team building technologies around AOL’s contextual and behavioural advertising targeting platforms. In 2008, he co-founded Salorix, a Silicon Valley–based startup whose product Amplfy enabled global brands to analyse real-time social conversations and identify effective audience segments.

In 2014, he joined Facebook where he focused on emerging market products and advertising strategy across approximately 300–350 million users in 79 countries. From 2015 to 2017, he was Senior Vice President, Technology and Products at Delhivery, India’s largest third-party eCommerce logistics company, which completed a $4 billion IPO in 2022. In 2018, he was appointed as the Chief Data Scientist of Airtel, world’s second largest telco with 450 million subscribers in 18 countries.

From December 2021 to December 2023, he served as Chief Technologist, Data and Platforms at NatWest Group (UK), overseeing data assets and products for the bank's 2,200-person worldwide engineering team.

=== "India Class" data problems ===
During his tenure at Facebook, and subsequently at Delhivery, Bhattacharya developed a framework for technology challenges specific to large emerging economies, which he termed "India Class" problems: challenges arising at the intersection of large volumes of unstructured private data, nascent consumer behaviour, expectations of free digital services, and limited public data infrastructure. A defining example is address disambiguation in India, where 80% of addresses are written relative to a landmark rather than a formal street address, making geolocation unreliable for logistics, emergency services and eCommerce. He presented this framework at the 2020 World Economic Forum in Davos, and his address disambiguation work at Delhivery was independently reported by Le Monde and The Economist.

== Healthcare AI ==
Bhattacharya is a co-founder and Chief Scientist of Serent.AI, a New York based healthcare AI company developing AI systems for ICD-10 medical coding and OASIS clinical documentation review for home health agencies, with the goal of reducing administrative burden and improving reimbursement accuracy in the home health sector.

He was appointed as a member of the COVID-19 Mobility Data Network at Harvard University, which provided daily updates to state and local decision-makers on the effectiveness of social distancing interventions, combining infectious disease epidemiology with aggregated mobility data from technology companies. Research on mobility data analysis and its public health applications was published in a 2021 survey co-authored with collaborators across multiple institutions.

With the rise of Agentic AI systems and growing focus on AI safety in recent times, Bhattacharya has conducted research on deployment coverage risk in machine learning and pre-deployment reliability auditing in Agentic AI.

== Research ==
Bhattacharya is a scientist at the Camera Culture Group of the MIT Media Lab, working with Ramesh Raskar on decentralised AI and agentic systems. His work spans three active projects: Project NANDA, a decentralised infrastructure for self-governing AI agents built on Anthropic's Model Context Protocol and Google's Agent-to-Agent framework; Large Population Models, AI-powered population scale simulations for applications including pandemic response and climate resilience; and Project Iceberg, which introduces the Iceberg Index as a measure of occupational vulnerability to AI automatibility across 171 million workers, 923 occupations, and $9.4 trillion in annual labour value. Work on the social coordination of agentic AI systems was presented at the 42nd International Conference on Machine Learning.

== Speaking and academic service ==
Bhattacharya has spoken at over a hundred international conferences on artificial intelligence, technology and healthcare. He served as general Co-chair of the International Conference on AI ML Systems (AIMLSystems). Notable speaking engagements include EmTech MIT, The AI Summit London, and the India AI Impact Summit 2026, an official Government of India summit held in New Delhi.
