= Dan Pickett =

American technology entrepreneur

Daniel T. Pickett III
- Born: July 27, 1968 (age 58); Troy, New York
- Education: Rensselaer Polytechnic Institute (RPI)
- Occupation: Technology Entrepreneur

Daniel T. Pickett III (born July 27, 1968) is an American technology entrepreneur, and private equity investor. Pickett is the co-founder, president and CEO of aptihealth, a digital behavioral health company. He is the former CEO of Hudson River Capital Holdings, a private investment company in New York. He was previously president of Zones.

== Early life and education ==
Pickett was born in 1968 in Troy, New York. Pickett was brought up in Mechanicville, New York, a small city north of Albany, where his parents owned a liquor store. His mother was a registered nurse. Pickett received his degree from Rensselaer Polytechnic Institute (RPI) in the field of Industrial and Management Engineering, where he is a member of the Board of Trustees.

== Business career ==
Beginning his career in 1990, Pickett worked at KeyCorp in Albany, New York. During his time with KeyCorp, Pickett worked in the area of technology and operations. Pickett was responsible for integrating the retail delivery platforms and networks of several acquisitions. Over a five-year period with KeyCorp, Pickett was appointed vice-president.

While serving at KeyCorp, Pickett co-founded nfrastructure with his brother and his father in the basement of the family's liquor store. nfrastructure helps large enterprises design, build, and operate integrated technology environments.

In 1995 Pickett founded ACE Software Sciences, known for creating the MaxMilion software product. MaxMilion was acquired in 1999 by ALLTEL. Pickett joined ALLTEL with the acquisition, where he ultimately became Senior Vice President and General Manager of Enterprise Banking Solutions.

In 2003, Pickett founded Hudson River Capital Holdings, a private investment company that specializes in growth-stage private equity investments.

In 2005, Pickett was appointed chairman of the board of nfrastructure, and was appointed its CEO in July 2008. In 2013, Inc. Magazine named nfrastructure to its Build 100 list of most sustained growth companies. nfrastructure’s clients included Adidas, Disney, and Starbucks. In 2016, nfrastructure was acquired by Zones, creating a $1.5 billion global technology company. In 2019, Pickett was appointed president of Zones, LLC.

Pickett left Zones at the end of 2019 to focus full time on investments in social impact companies through Hudson River Capital Holdings, his private investment company.

In 2020, Pickett joined aptihealth as president and CEO, he is also a co-founder. Founded in 2017, aptihealth is a tech-enabled behavioral health engagement company. Pickett was the first seed investor in the project, having invested millions of his own money into the company.

=== Board positions ===
Pickett has served on the board of the Albany Medical Center and the local Saratoga chapter of Gilda’s Club. Pickett is also a member of the board of directors for his alma mater, Rensselaer Polytechnic Institute. He was the youngest member to join the board of directors in the school’s history at the time.

== Personal life ==
In September 2010, New York State Governor Andrew M. Cuomo named Pickett to the Upstate Business Advisory Council to advise his administration on business issues.

Pickett has been a regular political donor to Cuomo and has hosted fundraisers for Cuomo that have attracted business leaders from the greater Capital Region.

In July 2017, Pickett was named by Politico, along with 17 other donors including hedge fund managers Ronald Perelman, Steven Cohen and James Simons, as donors that have given more than $100k to Governor Andrew M. Cuomo's campaign committee during his second term.

== Honors and awards ==
In November 2011, Pickett's company nfrastructure was named The Business Review's Company of the Year by the Albany Business Review.

In 2016, Pickett's company, nfrastructure was one of only 48 companies named a CRN Triple Crown Winner – placing on the Solution Provider 500 list of the largest solution providers in North America according to revenue; the Fast Growth 150, which ranks the fastest-growing solution providers; and the Tech Elite 250 solution providers, with the highest level of certifications from major vendors.
