= Spool (software company) =

Social bookmarking program and social network

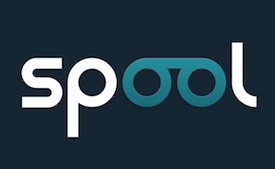
- Original author(s): Avichal Garg, Curtis Spencer
- Initial release: June 15, 2011; 13 years ago
- Operating system: iOS 3.1.2 or later; Android 2.2 or later
- License: Freeware
- Website: getspool.com

Spool was a free social bookmarking program and social network that was launched in October 2011 at TechCrunch Disrupt. The service allowed users to cache a webpage, including any media on the page, for offline consumption on any mobile device. Spool raised over $1 million from angel investors in January 2012. Facebook, Inc. acquired Spool in July 2012, in what was rumored to be a very competitive process.
