= Nadim Kobeissi =

Canadian computer programmer and security researcher (born 1990)

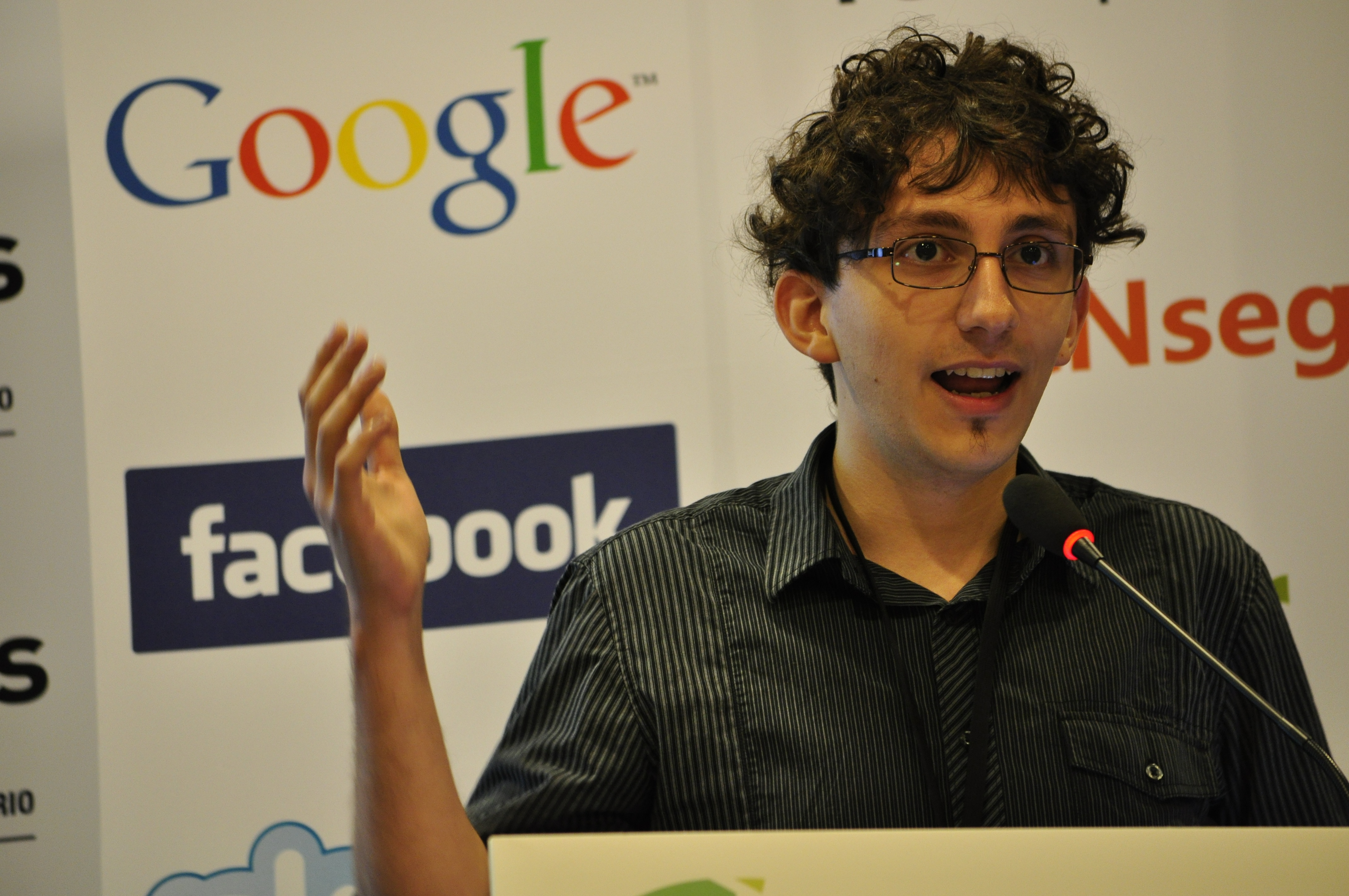
- Nadim Kobeissi in 2012
- Born: 28 September 1990 (age 35); Beirut, Lebanon
- Citizenship: Lebanon, France
- Education: Philosophy (BA); Computer science (PhD)
- Alma mater: Concordia University; École normale supérieure French Institute for Research in Computer Science and Automation
- Known for: Cryptocat; Dr. Kobushi's Labyrinthine Laboratory
- Scientific career
- Fields: Computer science, Cryptography, Internet Activism
- Website: nadim.computer

Nadim Kobeissi (Arabic: نديم قبيسي; born 28 September 1990) is a French-Lebanese computer science researcher specialized in applied cryptography. He is the author of Cryptocat, an open-source encrypted web chat client. Kobeissi is also known for speaking publicly against Internet censorship and Internet surveillance.

== Early life and education ==
Kobeissi was born in Beirut, Lebanon. He studied at the Lebanese American University in Beirut from 2008 to 2009, and graduated with a degree in philosophy at Concordia University in Montreal, Canada in 2013.

Kobeissi was a Ph.D. student in applied cryptography at Inria in Paris from 2015 to 2018.

In 2018 and 2019 he was adjunct professor of computer science at New York University's Paris campus teaching a course on computer security. In 2021 Kobeissi was naturalized French Citizen. Kobeissi is fluent in Arabic, French, and English and is based in Paris.

== Research ==
Kobeissi is the primary author of Cryptocat. The project was discontinued in 2019.

In 2015, Kobeissi became active in researching formal verification for cryptographic protocols. In December 2018, he defended his Ph.D. thesis, "Formal Verification for Real-World Cryptographic Protocols and Implementations. (Vérification formelle des protocoles et des implementations cryptographiques).".

== Hacktivism ==
In 2010, Kobeissi was an early supporter of US army whistleblower Chelsea Manning. He organized a march through Montreal in December that year in support of WikiLeaks, ran a WikiLeaks mirror site, and defended WikiLeaks on various Canadian news publications. During 2011 and 2012, Kobeissi hosted CHOMP.FM, a radio program on Internet activism that ran weekly on Montreal's CKUT-FM radio station. The show included guests from the Electronic Frontier Foundation (EFF), security researcher Bruce Schneier, and journalist Glenn Greenwald.

In 2013, Kobeissi led an effort known as the Skype Open Letter which brought together more than forty organizations, including the Electronic Frontier Foundation, Reporters Without Borders, and the Open Technology Institute, calling on Microsoft and Skype to release transparency reports regarding Skype monitoring and surveillance. The effort was successful, and Microsoft released its first transparency report shortly after the letter was published.
