= Leon Szeli =

German entrepreneur

Leon Szeli (born August 29, 1993 in Munich) is a German entrepreneur. He is the co-founder and was the CEO of Presize which was acquired by Meta.

== Career ==
Leon Szeli studied at Ludwig-Maximilians-Universität München (BA) and at Technical University of Munich (MSc). He graduated the elite study program at Center for Digital Technology & Management. At Stanford University and University of Cambridge he worked as a researcher in the field of Artificial Intelligence.

In 2019, he founded Presize. The company developed a size recommendation technology for the fashion ecommerce industry. Leon Szeli and the company are known for their appearances on the German-version of the TV show "Dragon's Den" called "Die Höhle der Löwen", where they received the second largest investment of the show from the billionaire Carsten Maschmeyer in 2020.

In 2022, Presize was acquired by Meta. It is considered one of the most important startup exits in Germany in 2022.
