= Eric Yuan =

Chinese-American billionaire businessman

- 袁征
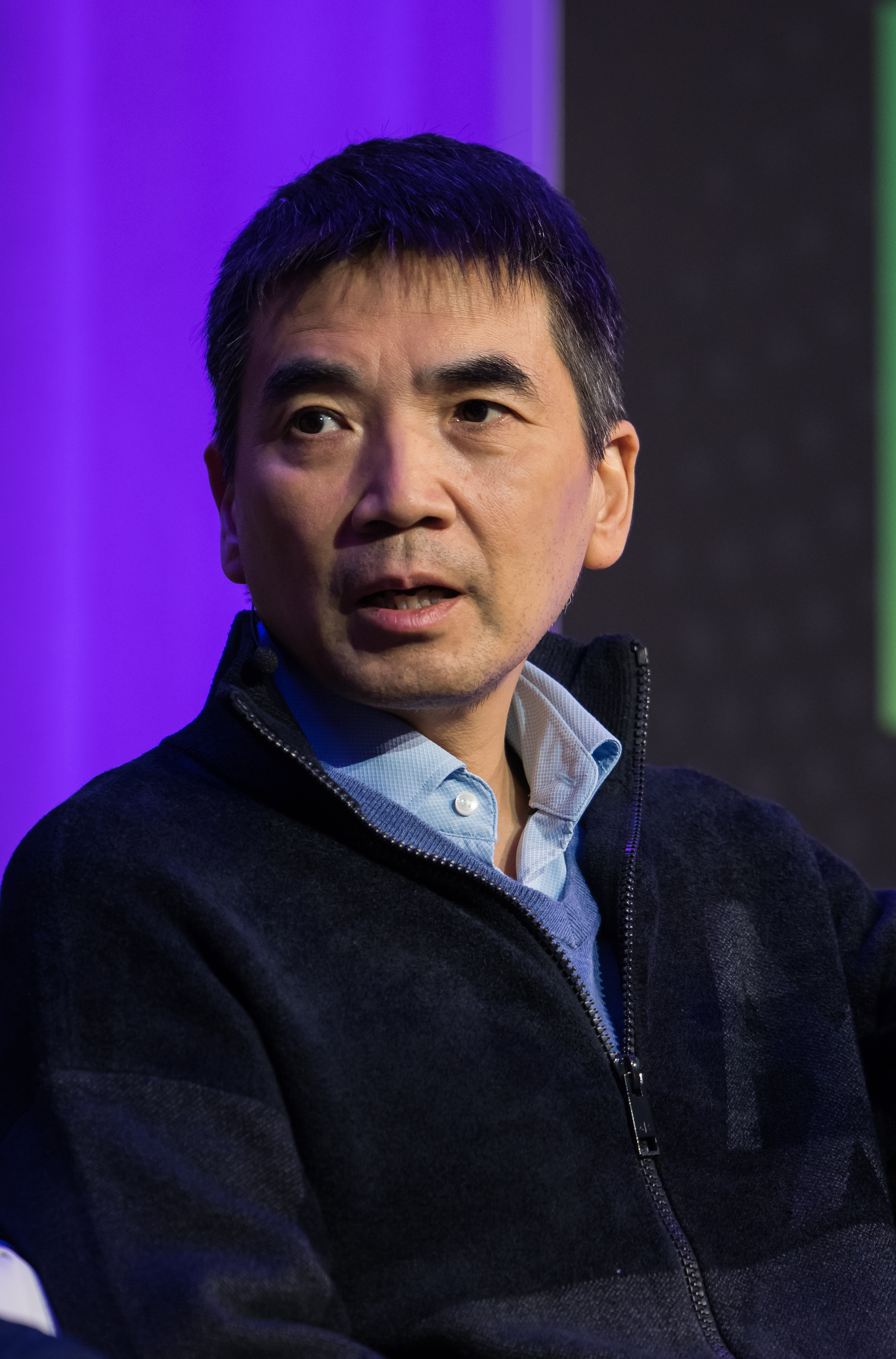
- Yuan in 2025
- Born: 20 February 1970 (age 56); Tai'an, Shandong, China
- Citizenship: United States
- Education: Shandong University of Science and Technology (BS); China University of Mining and Technology (MS)
- Occupation: Businessman
- Title: Founder and CEO, Zoom Communications
- Spouse: Sherry (m. 1991 or 1992)
- Children: 3

Chinese name
- Chinese: 袁征
Transcriptions
Standard Mandarin
- Hanyu Pinyin: Yuán Zhēng

Eric S Yuan (Chinese: 袁征; pinyin: Yuán Zhēng; born 20 February 1970) is a Chinese-American billionaire businessman, engineer, and the chief executive officer and founder of Zoom Communications, of which he owns 22%.

== Early life and education ==
Yuan is the son of geological engineers. He was born and raised in Tai'an, Shandong Province, China. In the fourth grade, Yuan collected construction scraps to recycle copper for cash.

As a first-year university student in 1987, Yuan was inspired to develop videotelephony software while he took 10-hour train rides to visit his girlfriend and was looking for an easier way to "visit" her. Yuan earned a bachelor's degree in applied mathematics with a minor in computer application from Shandong University of Science and Technology, and a master's degree in geology engineering from China University of Mining and Technology in Beijing. Yuan completed a Stanford University executive program in 2006.

== Career ==
After earning his master's degree, Yuan lived in Beijing, and attended a training program in Japan for four months. Inspired by Bill Gates, who spoke in Japan in 1995, Yuan moved to Silicon Valley in 1997 to join the tech boom. At the time, Yuan spoke very little English, and applied nine times before being granted a visa to the United States.

Upon arriving in the U.S., Yuan joined WebEx, a web conferencing startup, where he was one of the first 20 hires. The company was acquired by Cisco Systems in 2007, at which time Yuan became vice president of engineering. In 2011, he pitched a new smartphone-friendly video conferencing system to Cisco management. When the idea was rejected, Yuan left Cisco to establish his own company, Zoom Communications.

In 2019, Zoom became a public company via an initial public offering, at which time Yuan became a billionaire. His wealth increased during COVID-19 pandemic, as Zoom benefited from the shift to online work and teaching. On 1 September 2020, Yuan's net worth was estimated to be US$16.4 billion, a figure 360% higher than his net worth at the beginning of the year. In March 2021, Yuan transferred $6 billion worth of Zoom shares to a grantor retained annuity trust, for which Yuan is a trustee.

In 2024, he announced plans to allow people to avoid attending Zoom meetings by using AI clones as their replacements.

== Personal life ==
Yuan married his girlfriend, Sherry, at the age of 22, while he was a master's student at China University of Mining and Technology in Beijing. They have three children. Yuan and his family live in Santa Clara, California. In 2007, Yuan became a naturalized United States citizen.

Yuan chose the middle name "S" after Subrah Iyar, cofounder of WebEx.

== Recognition ==
Yuan was named the 2020 Time Businessperson of the Year, and was included in the Time 100 Most Influential People of 2020. In 2020, Yuan was named by Carnegie Corporation of New York as an honoree of the Great Immigrants Awards In 2025, Yuan was elected to the National Academy of Engineering.
