= Workplace (software) =

Defunct online collaborative software

- Developer: Meta Platforms
- Type: Collaborative software
- Website: workplace.com

Workplace was an online collaborative software tool developed by Meta Platforms officially launched in June 2018 and shut down on May 31, 2026.

Workplace features included instant messaging, file sharing, and video and audio conferencing.

== History ==
On January 14, 2015, Facebook (later renamed Meta) announced Workplace. It launched in beta as Facebook at Work before officially launching in October 2016. Free accounts were discontinued as of February 2021.

Workplace for Good was launched in June 2018 to provide a free version of Workplace for registered non-profits and staff of educational institutions.

In October 2018, Workplace announced the launch of Safety Check. Originally developed by Facebook engineers after the 2011 Japanese tsunami, Safety Check for Workplace allowed organizations to identify employees who may be affected by a crisis and send and monitor responses. Safety Check has been used by Delta Air Lines (during Hurricane Florence and the Hokkaido earthquake).

As of May 2021, there were 7 million paying users.

On 14 May 2024, Meta announced Workplace shutdown in 2026, encouraging users and system administrators to migrate to Zoom-owned Workvivo or download their data. On September 1, 2025, Workplace website entered read-only mode and the Workplace mobile app and the Workchat desktop app stopped working. Meta discontinued data export on May 31, 2026.

As of June 2026, workplace.com redirects to meta.com page plainly stating "Workplace has closed as of May 2026."

== Functions ==
While Workplace accounts were set up and run separately from Facebook accounts, Workplace used much of Facebook's underlying technology. Workplace used machine learning to rank information in a user's news feed and make recommendations, while 'downranking' less relevant information. Workplace data was stored across 12 Facebook-owned and operated data centers.

== Reception ==
PC Mag described it as "Facebook if your employer restricted membership to only your coworkers and bosses" and concluded "Workplace is what an organization makes of it".

== See also ==
- List of collaborative software
