= Lightbox.com =

- Viewing a posted photo in Lightbox Android app
- Developer: Lightbox
- Release: June 5, 2011; 15 years ago
- Operating system: Android 2.1 or later
- Size: 2.3 MB
- Type: Photobloging
- License: Freeware
- Website: lightbox.com

Lightbox.com was a website, Android app, and photo blogging platform that allowed users to post images, text, links, and more to their personal photo blog.

== History ==
Founded by Thai Tran (formerly a product manager at Google and YouTube) and Nilesh Patel, Lightbox received $1.1 million in seed funding from Index, Accel, SV Angel, 500 Startups, and others.

On December 12, 2011, Lightbox launched its Version 2.0. At this time, Tran announced that the Android app was approaching 1 million downloads.

On May 15, 2012, the Lightbox.com team was acquired by Facebook This had caused Lightbox to be fully closed on June 15, 2012.

On November 14, 2015, in spite of the prior entity's closure, owner registration of the "lightbox.com" internet domain name was renewed for 10 additional years, through 2025.

== Awards ==
- In October 2011, PC World listed Lightbox.com at number 72 in PC World 100 Best Products of 2011.
