= Snaptu =

Cross-platform mobile app

SnaptuGo
- Developer: Snaptu
- Stable release: 1.7.1 / March 2011
- Type: Mobile application
- License: Freeware
- Website: snaptu.com

Snaptu pronounced "snap tu", previously known as Moblica was a free Israeli-made mobile application platform that ran on virtually every type of Internet-enabled mobile phone. It allowed the user to access popular services, varying from social networks like Facebook, Twitter, Flickr, ESPN CricInfo and Picasa to entertainment news, blogs, sports and local guides.

== Overview ==
The app was created by an Israeli startup called Moblica and was originally known as Moblica. Snaptu's focus was its ability to connect users with even a rudimentary phone to the mobile web. The product's cross-platform capabilities stem from its methodology, in which the applications do not run on the mobile phone itself, but on Internet servers.

Snaptu was a collection of apps including Twitter, LinkedIn, Picasa, Flickr and others, available from its own app store. Snaptu bundled more than 30 free applications and more than 25 web links as of September 23, 2010.

In January 2011, the Snaptu application had over 78 million users worldwide.

== Acquisition by Facebook ==
Facebook and Snaptu had been working on a Facebook application and had released it on 19 January 2011. According to the company blog it works on 80% of mobile phones available in the market.

A press release in March 2011 at the company blog confirmed that the company has agreed to be acquired by Facebook. Company stated in its blog that the reason for being acquired by Facebook was that "it offered the best opportunity to keep accelerating the pace of our product development." It also stated that the acquisition will end in few weeks and in the transition period Snaptu will continue to operate normally. According to Israeli publication Globes, the deal is worth US$60–US$70 million.

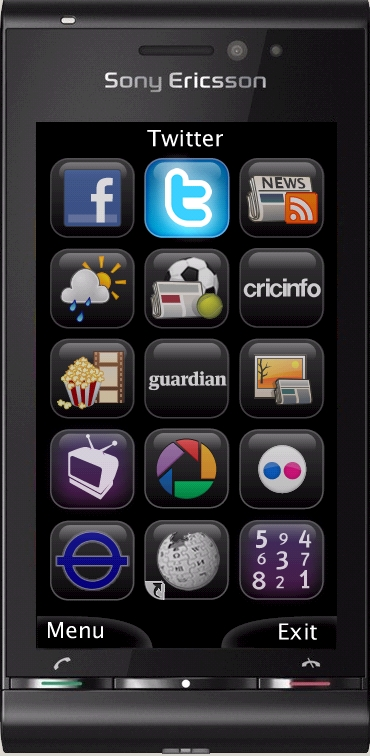
Snaptu Mobile Phone Home Page

At the end of October Snaptu announced to all its users that on the 11 November 2011 they would end most of their apps. This includes the discontinuation of their Twitter, Cricinfo and LinkedIn apps. Instead of continuing development on these applications, the focus would turn to their standalone Facebook app.

At the end of December 2011, Snaptu's functionality ceased in its entirety, replaced with a message telling users that the service had ceased, and provided a link to download the successor application, "Facebook for Every Phone".

On July 22, 2013, Facebook announced that Facebook for Every Phone has reached over 100 million monthly active users. A few months later, the company released a white paper that included an entire chapter about Facebook for Every Phone. The chapter revealed many details regarding the technical operation of the Snaptu system and the methods used to achieve high efficiency.

On September 12, 2014, the Facebook app page of Facebook for Every Phone indicated over half a billion likes. Despite this high number, the company hasn't released any additional information about the app.

== Facebook lite ==
Facebook has further repurposed the Snaptu technology stack and on June 4, 2015 it launched its Facebook Lite app for low-end Android devices based on the Snaptu technology. The company had been testing the app for a while and had been gradually rolling it out to a growing part of its user base. On February 8, 2017, Facebook announced that Facebook Lite is being used by 200 million people. In October 2018, Facebook started testing Facebook Lite for iOS. Just like its Android counterpart, the iOS app is targeting older and slower phones.
