= Qualcomm Ventures =

Investment arm of Qualcomm

- Type: Corporate venture fund
- Founded: 2000
- Headquarters: San Diego, California, United States
- Number of locations: 7 locations: San Diego, San Francisco, Israel, Europe, China, India, Latin America, Korea
- Key people: Quinn Li (Global Head)
- Website: www.qualcommventures.com

Qualcomm Ventures is the investment arm of Qualcomm Incorporated. Founded in 2000, Qualcomm Ventures is a corporate venture capital fund with 140+ active portfolio companies. Investing in startups targeting the wireless ecosystem, the group focuses on investments in the sectors of automotive, data center and enterprise, digital health, Internet of Things (IoT), and mobile.

== History ==
Qualcomm Ventures has experienced seven portfolio company exits of $1 billion, including 99 (app), Cruise Automation, Fitbit, Invensense, NQ Mobile, and Ring, Waze.

In November, 2018, Qualcomm Ventures announced it has plans to invest up to $100 million in artificial intelligence. It will provide capital to startups building on-device AI, which is AI that runs on the end device, like a smartphone or vehicle, rather than in the cloud.

In June, 2021, Qualcomm Ventures invested into London-based FloLive IoT startup together with Intel Capital, Dell Technologies and other VCs.

In July, 2021, Qualcomm Ventures co-led the Series C funding round of $25 million for the Swedish VR games studio Resolution Games. It has brought the company's total funding to $38.5 million.

In July 2023, the United States House Select Committee on Strategic Competition between the United States and the Chinese Communist Party initiated an investigation into Qualcomm Ventures and other venture-capital firms' investments in China.
