= Signal Protocol =

Non-federated cryptographic protocol

- Communication protocol
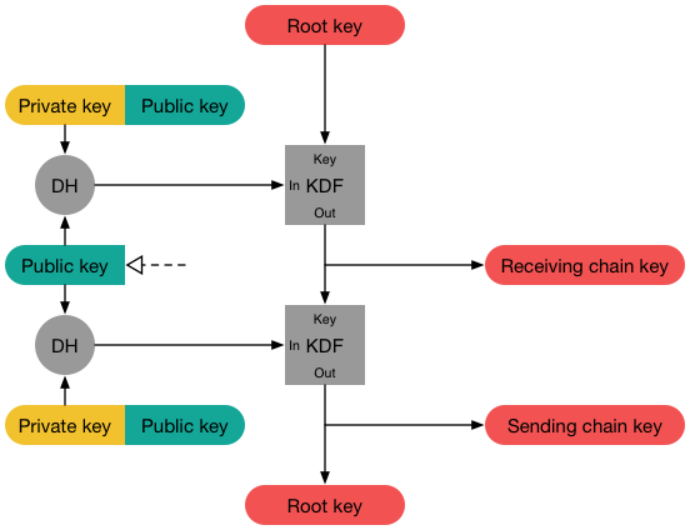
- Signal Protocol full double ratchet step
- Purpose: End-to-end encrypted communications
- Developer: Signal Foundation
- Based on: OTR, SCIMP
- Influenced: OMEMO, Matrix
- OSI layer: Application layer
- Website: signal.org/docs

The Signal Protocol (formerly known as the TextSecure Protocol) is a non-federated cryptographic protocol that provides end-to-end encryption for voice and instant messaging conversations. The protocol was developed by Open Whisper Systems in 2013 and was introduced in the open-source TextSecure app, which later became Signal. Several closed-source applications have implemented the protocol, such as WhatsApp, which is said to encrypt the conversations of "more than a billion people worldwide" or Google who provides end-to-end encryption by default to all RCS-based conversations between users of their Google Messages app for one-to-one conversations. Facebook Messenger also say they offer the protocol for optional "Secret Conversations", as did Skype for its "Private Conversations".

The protocol combines the Double Ratchet Algorithm, prekeys (i.e., one-time ephemeral public keys that have been uploaded in advance to a central server), and key agreement protocols including the original triple elliptic-curve Diffie–Hellman (3-DH) handshake and the post-quantum PQXDH protocol. Current Signal specifications model message encryption as authenticated encryption with associated data (AEAD), with recommended constructions including SIV-style AEAD schemes or a composition of AES-256 in CBC mode with HMAC.

== History ==
The development of the Signal Protocol was started by Trevor Perrin and Moxie Marlinspike (Open Whisper Systems) in 2013. The first version of the protocol, TextSecure v1, was based on Off-the-record messaging (OTR).

On 24 February 2014, Open Whisper Systems introduced TextSecure v2, which migrated to the Axolotl Ratchet. The design of the Axolotl Ratchet is based on the ephemeral key exchange that was introduced by OTR and combines it with a symmetric-key ratchet modeled after the Silent Circle Instant Message Protocol (SCIMP). It brought about support for asynchronous communication ("offline messages") as its major new feature, as well as better resilience with distorted order of messages and simpler support for conversations with multiple participants. The Axolotl Ratchet was named after the critically endangered aquatic salamander Axolotl, which has extraordinary self-healing capabilities. The developers refer to the algorithm as self-healing because it automatically disables an attacker from accessing the cleartext of later messages after having compromised a session key.

The third version of the protocol, TextSecure v3, made some changes to the cryptographic primitives and the wire protocol. In October 2014, researchers from Ruhr University Bochum published an analysis of TextSecure v3. Among other findings, they presented an unknown key-share attack on the protocol, but in general, they found that it was secure.

In March 2016, the developers renamed the protocol to Signal Protocol. They also renamed the Axolotl Ratchet to the Double Ratchet algorithm to better differentiate between the ratchet and the full protocol because some had used the name Axolotl when referring to the full protocol.

As of October 2016, the Signal Protocol is based on TextSecure v3, but with additional cryptographic changes. In October 2016, researchers from the UK's University of Oxford, Australia's Queensland University of Technology, and Canada's McMaster University published a formal analysis of the protocol, concluding that the protocol was cryptographically sound.

Another audit of the protocol was published in 2017.

In 2023, Signal introduced PQXDH, a post-quantum extension of X3DH for session establishment. In 2025, Signal announced the Triple Ratchet, which combines the classical Double Ratchet with the Sparse Post-Quantum Ratchet (SPQR).

== Properties ==
The protocol provides confidentiality, integrity, authentication, participant consistency, destination validation, forward secrecy, post-compromise security (aka future secrecy), causality preservation, message unlinkability, message repudiation, participation repudiation, and asynchronicity. It does not provide anonymity preservation and requires servers for the relaying of messages and storing of public key material.

The Signal Protocol also supports end-to-end encrypted group chats. The group chat protocol is a combination of a pairwise double ratchet and multicast encryption. In addition to the properties provided by the one-to-one protocol, the group chat protocol provides speaker consistency, out-of-order resilience, dropped message resilience, computational equality, trust equality, subgroup messaging, as well as contractible and expandable membership.

=== Authentication ===
For authentication, users can manually compare public key fingerprints through an outside channel. This makes it possible for users to verify each other's identities and avoid a man-in-the-middle attack. An implementation can also choose to employ a trust on first use mechanism in order to notify users if a correspondent's key changes.

In August 2026, Signal introduced automatic key verification, a system based on key transparency that allows a user's encryption key to be independently confirmed through verifications performed by the user, their contacts, and third-party auditors, without requiring an in-person meeting or a secondary communication channel as manual safety-number comparison does. The system operates by incorporating changes to a user's phone number, username, or account into Signal's key-transparency directory whenever the account is registered, modified, or re-created, guarding against a scenario in which the key directory itself is tampered with to substitute a different key without the account owner's knowledge.

=== Metadata ===
The Signal Protocol does not prevent a company from retaining information about when and with whom users communicate. There can therefore be differences in how messaging service providers choose to handle this information. Signal's privacy policy states that recipients' identifiers are only kept on the Signal servers as long as necessary in order to transmit each message. In June 2016, Moxie Marlinspike told The Intercept: "the closest piece of information to metadata that the Signal server stores is the last time each user connected to the server, and the precision of this information is reduced to the day, rather than the hour, minute, and second."

In October 2018, Signal Messenger announced that they had implemented a "sealed sender" feature into Signal, which reduces the amount of metadata that the Signal servers have access to by concealing the sender's identifier. The sender's identity is conveyed to the recipient in each message, but is encrypted with a key that the server does not have. This is done automatically if the sender is in the recipient's contacts or has access to their Signal Profile. Users can also enable an option to receive "sealed sender" messages from non-contacts and people who do not have access to their Signal Profile. A contemporaneous wiretap of the user's device and/or the Signal servers may still reveal that the device's IP address accessed a Signal server to send or receive messages at certain times.

== Usage ==
Open Whisper Systems first introduced the protocol in application TextSecure. They later merged an encrypted voice call application named RedPhone into TextSecure and renamed it Signal.

In November 2014, Open Whisper Systems announced a partnership with WhatsApp to provide end-to-end encryption by incorporating the Signal Protocol into each WhatsApp client platform. Open Whisper Systems said that they had already incorporated the protocol into the latest WhatsApp client for Android and that support for other clients, group/media messages, and key verification would be coming soon after. On April 5, 2016, WhatsApp and Open Whisper Systems announced that they had finished adding end-to-end encryption to "every form of communication" on WhatsApp, and that users could now verify each other's keys. In February 2017, WhatsApp announced a new feature, WhatsApp Status, which uses the Signal Protocol to secure its contents. In October 2016, WhatsApp's parent company Facebook also deployed an optional mode called Secret Conversations in Facebook Messenger which provides end-to-end encryption using an implementation of the Signal Protocol.

In September 2015, G Data Software launched a new messaging app called Secure Chat which used the Signal Protocol. G Data discontinued the service in May 2018.

In September 2016, Google launched a new messaging app called Allo, which featured an optional "incognito mode" that used the Signal Protocol for end-to-end encryption. In March 2019, Google discontinued Allo in favor of their Google Messages app on Android. In November 2020, Google announced that they would be using the Signal Protocol to provide end-to-end encryption by default to all RCS-based conversations between users of their Google Messages app, starting with one-to-one conversations.

In January 2018, Open Whisper Systems and Microsoft announced the addition of Signal Protocol support to an optional Skype mode called Private Conversations.

== Influence ==
The Signal Protocol has had an influence on other cryptographic protocols. In May 2016, Viber said that their encryption protocol is a custom implementation that "uses the same concepts" as the Signal Protocol. Forsta's developers have said that their app uses a custom implementation of the Signal Protocol.

The Double Ratchet Algorithm that was introduced as part of the Signal Protocol has also been adopted by other protocols. OMEMO is an XMPP Extension Protocol (XEP) that was introduced in the Conversations messaging app and approved by the XMPP Standards Foundation (XSF) in December 2016 as XEP-0384. Matrix is an open communications protocol that includes Olm, a library that provides optional end-to-end encryption on a room-by-room basis via a Double Ratchet Algorithm implementation. The developers of Wire have said that their app uses a custom implementation of the Double Ratchet Algorithm.

Messaging Layer Security, an IETF proposal, uses Asynchronous ratcheting trees to efficiently improve upon security guarantees over Signal's Double Ratchet.

== Implementations ==
Signal Messenger maintains a reference implementation of the Signal Protocol library written in Rust under the AGPLv3 license on GitHub. There are bindings to Swift, Java, TypeScript, C, and other languages that use the reference Rust implementation.

Signal previously maintained the following deprecated libraries:

- libsignal-protocol-c: A library written in C with additional licensing permissions for Apple's App Store.
- libsignal-protocol-java: A library written in Java.
- libsignal-protocol-javascript: A library written in JavaScript.

There are also alternative libraries written by third-parties in other languages, such as TypeScript.

== See also ==
- Comparison of instant messaging protocols
- Comparison of cryptography libraries
- Post-Quantum Extended Diffie–Hellman
- Sender Keys

== Literature ==
- Cohn-Gordon, Katriel; Cremers, Cas; Dowling, Benjamin; Garratt, Luke; Stebila, Douglas (25 October 2016). "A Formal Security Analysis of the Signal Messaging Protocol". Cryptology ePrint Archive. International Association for Cryptologic Research (IACR). Archived from the original on 28 December 2016.
- Frosch, Tilman; Mainka, Christian; Bader, Christoph; Bergsma, Florian; Schwenk, Jörg; Holz, Thorsten (March 2016). "How Secure is TextSecure?". 2016 IEEE European Symposium on Security and Privacy (EuroS&P). Saarbrücken, Germany: IEEE. pp. 457–472. doi:10.1109/EuroSP.2016.41. ISBN 978-1-5090-1752-2.
- Rottermanner, Christoph; Kieseberg, Peter; Huber, Markus; Schmiedecker, Martin; Schrittwieser, Sebastian (December 2015). Privacy and Data Protection in Smartphone Messengers (PDF). Proceedings of the 17th International Conference on Information Integration and Web-based Applications & Services (iiWAS2015). ACM International Conference Proceedings Series. ISBN 978-1-4503-3491-4. Archived (PDF) from the original on 27 March 2016.
- Unger, Nik; Dechand, Sergej; Bonneau, Joseph; Fahl, Sascha; Perl, Henning; Goldberg, Ian Avrum; Smith, Matthew (2015). "SoK: Secure Messaging" (PDF). 2015 IEEE Symposium on Security and Privacy. Proceedings of the 2015 IEEE Symposium on Security and Privacy. IEEE Computer Society's Technical Committee on Security and Privacy. pp. 232–249. doi:10.1109/SP.2015.22. ISBN 978-1-4673-6949-7. Archived (PDF) from the original on 4 March 2016.
- Rösler, Paul; Mainka, Christian; Schwenk, Jörg (2017). More is Less: On the End-to-End Security of Group Chats in Signal, WhatsApp, and Threema. Cryptology ePrint Archive. International Association for Cryptologic Research (IACR). Archived from the original on 3 February 2019.
