= Whisper Systems =

Defunct American mobile security company

- Industry: Encryption software, Mobile software, Mobile security
- Founded: 2010
- Founders: Moxie Marlinspike; Stuart Anderson
- Defunct: November 28, 2011
- Fate: Acquired by Twitter
- Headquarters: San Francisco, California, U.S.
- Website: www.whispersys.com See Archived 17 January 2013 at the Wayback Machine

Whisper Systems was an American enterprise mobile security company that was co-founded by security researcher Moxie Marlinspike and roboticist Stuart Anderson in 2010. The company was acquired by Twitter in November 2011. Some of the company's software products were released under open-source licenses after the acquisition. An independent group called Open Whisper Systems later picked up the development of this open-source software, which led to the creation of the Signal Technology Foundation.

== History ==
Security researcher Moxie Marlinspike and roboticist Stuart Anderson co-founded Whisper Systems in 2010. The company produced proprietary enterprise mobile security software. Among these were an encrypted texting program called TextSecure and an encrypted voice calling app called RedPhone. They also developed a firewall and tools for encrypting other forms of data.

On November 28, 2011, Whisper Systems announced that it had been acquired by Twitter. The financial terms of the deal were not disclosed by either company. The acquisition was done "primarily so that Mr. Marlinspike could help the then-startup improve its security". Shortly after the acquisition, Whisper Systems' RedPhone service was made unavailable. Some criticized the removal, arguing that the software was "specifically targeted [to help] people under repressive regimes" and that it left people like the Egyptians in "a dangerous position" during the events of the 2011 Egyptian revolution.

Twitter released TextSecure as free and open-source software under the GPLv3 license in December 2011. RedPhone was also released under the same license in July 2012.

Marlinspike later left Twitter and founded Open Whisper Systems as a collaborative Open Source project for the continued development of TextSecure and RedPhone. Open Whisper Systems consisted of a large community of volunteer Open Source contributors, as well as a small team of dedicated grant-funded developers. In November 2015, Open Whisper Systems merged TextSecure with RedPhone and renamed it as Signal. In 2018, Signal Messenger was incorporated as an LLC by Moxie Marlinspike and Brian Acton and then rolled under the independent non-profit Signal Technology Foundation. Today, the Signal app is developed by Signal Messenger LLC, which is funded by the Signal Foundation. The foundation has stated publicly that they are not tied to any major technology companies and "can never be acquired by one either."

== Products ==
Whisper Systems' products were all made for Android and included:

- TextSecure: An app that allowed the user to exchange end-to-end encrypted SMS messages with other TextSecure users.
- RedPhone: An app that allowed the user to make end-to-end encrypted VoIP calls to other RedPhone users.
- Flashback: An app that allowed the user to store encrypted backups of their device in the cloud.
- WhisperCore: An app that integrated with the underlying Android OS to protect everything the user kept on their phone. The initial beta featured full disk encryption, network security tools, encrypted backup, selective permissions, and basic platform management tools for Nexus S and Nexus One phones.
- WhisperMonitor: An app that worked with WhisperCore to provide a software firewall capable of dynamic egress filtering and real-time connection monitoring, giving the user control over where their data was going and what their apps were doing.

== See also ==
- List of mergers and acquisitions by Twitter
