= Idka =

Collaborative platform headquartered in Sweden

- Website type: Platform for communication and collaboration
- Available in: Multilingual
- Headquarters: Stockholm, Sweden
- Area served: Worldwide
- Industry: Internet
- Website: www.idka.com
- Registration: Required to post, follow or be followed
- Current status: Discontinued

Idka AB was a collaborative platform headquartered in Sweden. Idka allowed a user to connect, share, store and share documents and files, while keeping user data safe. Idka was advertising-free, and fully encrypted. The solution combined all of the functionality of social media in one place. It promised it will never share or sell information. The user controlled the sharing.

Idka, which was available as an HTML5 web service, required no IT knowledge or support, and no installation of any kind except for apps on iOS and Android.

Idka announced on Twitter, on 21 April 2020, that they were shutting down. They also posted a notice to their users on idka.com, detailing data protection.

== Background ==
Idka was founded upon the belief that the advertising-driven model cannot be fixed, contrary to what Facebook and others have said. Idka was the antithesis to the 'Stalker Economy', the foundation of most social networking, where the users themselves are the product. The built-in drivers of the advertising model will inevitably lead to serious privacy violations, but more than that, it creates a problem for a free, democratic way of life. The problem of tailored news (echo chambers), dark posts, political ‘nudging’ and covert political campaigning, profiling and surveillance is real and has already had discernible impact.

== Description ==
Idka has been created as a product in its own right, where users pay a small monthly subscription for a service with short, understandable, and fair user terms.

The service was free of advertising, news streams, and manipulation. Idka centered on privacy and security, so encryption and 2-factor authentication is central. All default actions are set up to protect the user's privacy. There was no pre-population or prompting to invite or collect friends and contacts. A post was not shared when published without an intended and specific share action from the user. A private post could not be changed and shared with new people. People who were added to a many-to-many chat were able to see chat entries after they were added. A picture in a post could not be downloaded and it could be removed by the person who uploaded it. The information was removed from Idka servers.

The service covered a number of functions that are otherwise spread across several platforms, such as posting, chatting with end-to-end encryption (like Telegram and Signal), many-to-many chatting (like hang-out), integrated drag & drop cloud storage (like Box and Dropbox) without file size limits, etc. When a group was created, it would immediately have its own cloud storage, its own chat and posting wall. Members could be read-only if necessary.

The service also catered to companies with ‘organizational accounts’ and provides more functionality than other web services (such as Slack).
