= Cristian Mudure =

- Born: May 20, 1980 (age 46); Brașov, Romania
- Occupations: Entrepreneur, software executive
- Known for: Founder and CEO of Stackfield

Cristian Mudure (born 20 May 1980) is a Romanian-born entrepreneur and software executive. He is the founder and CEO of Stackfield GmbH, a Munich-based software company specialising in secure collaboration and project management tools.

== Early life and education ==
Mudure was born on 20 May 1980 in Brașov, Romania. During his youth, he competed in tennis before later shifting his focus to IT. Mudure completed his secondary education in Romania and later moved to Germany, where he briefly studied business administration.

== Career ==
Mudure started his career as an IT consultant.

In June 2012, Mudure founded Stackfield GmbH in Munich, Germany, and has served as its chief executive officer since then. The company develops a collaboration and project management platform used by organisations with data protection requirements. The platform integrates task and project management, team chat, videoconferencing, document collaboration, knowledge management, and time tracking within a single application. Stackfield operates its infrastructure on servers located in Germany and uses end-to-end encryption to protect user data. The platform has been adopted by organisations in sectors including public administration, legal services, healthcare, and finance. In early 2024, Cristian Mudure sold 30% of his company for a double-digit million euro to a private equity fond.

In 2025, Mudure was featured in Season 5, Episode 3 of SELFMADE, a German-language Amazon documentary series profiling entrepreneurs.

== Public activities ==
Mudure has publicly advocated for European digital sovereignty and reduced dependence on US technology providers. In a January 2026 opinion piece for Tagesspiegel Background, he argued that German and EU software companies are systematically overlooked in public procurement despite political rhetoric supporting digital independence, identifying convenience, vendor lock-in effects, and what he termed "sovereignty washing" by US hyperscalers as the main barriers to change. In February 2026, he called on European policymakers to pursue a proactive strategy for digital sovereignty rather than relying on theoretical switchability. Mudure has also been cited in trade media criticising the concept of "sovereign" cloud offerings by US companies, arguing that the US Cloud Act renders such arrangements insufficient regardless of server location.
