= Silent Circle (software) =

Encrypted communications firm

- Type: Private
- Industry: Software
- Founded: October 2011
- Headquarters: Washington DC, United States
- Key people: Gregg Smith - CEO
- Website: www.silentcircle.com

Silent Circle is an encrypted communications firm based in Washington DC. Silent Circle provides secure communication services for mobile devices and desktops. Launched October 16, 2012, the company operates under a subscription business model. The encryption part of the software used is free software/open source and peer-reviewed. For the remaining parts of Silent Phone and Silent Text, the source code is available on GitHub, but under proprietary software licenses.

== History ==
In November 2011, Mike Janke called Phil Zimmermann with an idea for a new kind of private, secure version of Skype. Zimmermann agreed to the project and called Jon Callas, co-founder of PGP Corporation and Vincent Moscaritolo. Janke brought in security expert Vic Hyder, and the founding team was established. The company was founded in the Caribbean island of Nevis, but moved its headquarters to Le Grand-Saconnex near Geneva, Switzerland in 2014 in search of a country with "stronger privacy laws to protect its customers' information."

On August 9, 2013, through their website, Silent Circle announced that the Silent Mail service would be shut down, because the company could "see the writing on the wall" and felt it was not possible to sufficiently secure email data with the looming threat of government compulsion and precedent set by the Lavabit shutdown the day before.

In January 2015, Silent Text had a serious vulnerability that allowed an attacker to remotely take control of a Blackphone device. A potential attacker only needed to know the target’s Silent Circle ID number or phone number. Blackphone and Silent Circle patched the vulnerability shortly after it had been disclosed.

In March 2015 there was a controversy when Information Security specialist and hacker Khalil Sehnaoui identified that Silent Circle's warrant canary had been removed from their site.

In January 2017 Gregg Smith was named CEO with a renewed focus on serving the large business space as well as Government entities. At the same time Tony Cole, VP and Global Government CTO of FireEye, was named to the Board of Directors. Shortly after Smith became CEO, the company moved back from Switzerland to the United States.

== Reception ==
In November 2014, Silent Phone and Silent Text received top scores on the Electronic Frontier Foundation's secure messaging scorecard, along with "ChatSecure + Orbot", Cryptocat, TextSecure, and "Signal / RedPhone". They received points for having communications encrypted in transit, having communications encrypted with keys the providers don't have access to (end-to-end encryption), making it possible for users to independently verify their correspondent's identities, having past communications secure if the keys are stolen (forward secrecy), having their code open to independent review (open source), having their security designs well-documented, and having recent independent security audits.

However, as of August 2020, the page for the secure messaging scorecard states that it is out of date and should not be used in privacy- and security-related decision-making.

== Products ==
The company's products enable encrypted mobile phone calls, text messaging, and video chat.

=== Current ===
Its current products include the following:

- Silent Phone: Encrypted voice calls, video calls and text messages on mobile devices. Currently available for iOS, Android, and Silent Circle’s Silent OS on Blackphone. It can be used with Wi-Fi, EDGE, 3G or 4G cellular anywhere in the world.

=== Discontinued ===
Its discontinued products include the following:

- Blackphone: A smartphone designed for privacy created by Silent Circle and built by SGP Technologies, a joint venture between Silent Circle and Geeksphone. There have been no more news or updates since 2018. PrivatOS was discontinued on June 30, 2016.
- GoSilent: Personal Firewall with integrated VPN and Cloud Analytics. The product was introduced after Silent Circle acquired Maryland start-up Kesala. It was sold by Silent Circle's new owner in 2018
- Silent Text: Discontinued September 28, 2015. A stand-alone application for encrypted text messaging and secure cloud content transfer with a “burn notice” feature for permanently deleting messages from devices. Its features were merged into Silent Phone.
- Silent Mail: Discontinued August 9, 2013. Silent Mail used to offer encrypted email on Silent Circle’s private, secure network and compatibility with popular email client software.

== Silent Circle Instant Message Protocol ==
Silent Circle Instant Message Protocol (SCIMP) was an encryption scheme that was developed by Vincent Moscaritolo. It enabled private conversation over instant message transports such as XMPP (Jabber).

SCIMP provided encryption, perfect forward secrecy and message authentication. It also handled negotiating the shared secret keys.

=== History ===
The protocol was used in Silent Text. Silent Text was discontinued on September 28, 2015, when its features were merged into Silent Circle's encrypted voice calling application called Silent Phone. At the same time, Silent Circle transitioned to using a protocol that uses the Double Ratchet Algorithm instead of SCIMP.

== Business model ==
The company is privately funded and operates under a subscription business model.

== See also ==
- Comparison of instant messaging clients
- Comparison of VoIP software
- Silent Circle Instant Messaging Protocol
