= Double Ratchet Algorithm =

Cryptographic key management algorithm

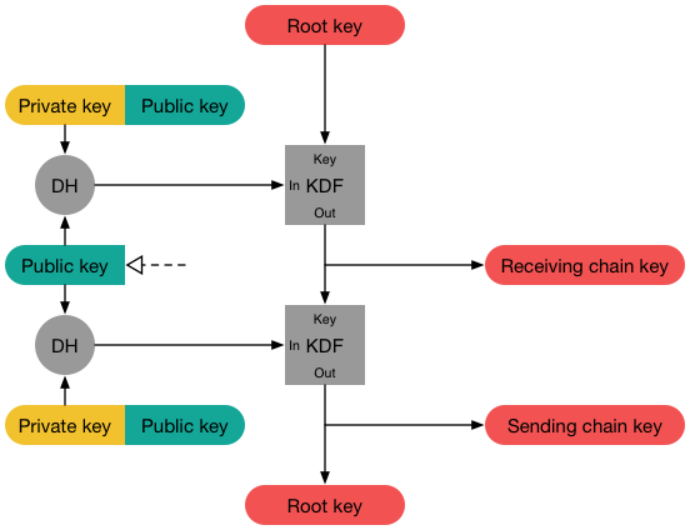
Full ratchet step in the double ratchet algorithm. The Key Derivation Function (KDF) provides the ratcheting mechanism. The first "ratchet" is applied to the symmetric root key, the second ratchet to the asymmetric Diffie–Hellman (DH) key.

In cryptography, the Double Ratchet Algorithm (previously referred to as the Axolotl Ratchet) is a key management algorithm that was developed by Trevor Perrin and Moxie Marlinspike in 2013. It can be used as part of a cryptographic protocol to provide end-to-end encryption for instant messaging. After an initial key exchange it manages the ongoing renewal and maintenance of short-lived session keys. It combines a cryptographic so-called "ratchet" based on the Diffie–Hellman key exchange (DH) and a ratchet based on a key derivation function (KDF), such as a hash function, and is therefore called a double ratchet.

The algorithm provides forward secrecy for messages, and implicit renegotiation of forward keys; properties for which the protocol is named.

This has been extended as of October 2025 to the Sparse Post Quantum Ratchet (SPQR) with a CRYSTALS-Kyber quantum ratchet to provide post-quantum Forward Secrecy and Post-Compromise Security guarantees in what the Signal authors call a Triple Ratchet.

== History ==
The Double Ratchet Algorithm was developed by Trevor Perrin and Moxie Marlinspike (Open Whisper Systems) in 2013 and introduced as part of the Signal Protocol in February 2014. The Double Ratchet Algorithm's design is based on the DH ratchet that was introduced by Off-the-Record Messaging (OTR) and combines it with a symmetric-key ratchet modeled after the Silent Circle Instant Messaging Protocol (SCIMP). The ratchet was initially named after the critically endangered aquatic salamander axolotl, which has extraordinary self-healing capabilities. In March 2016, the developers renamed the Axolotl Ratchet as the Double Ratchet Algorithm to better differentiate between the ratchet and the full protocol, because some had used the name Axolotl when referring to the Signal Protocol.

== Overview ==
A mechanical ratchet

The Double Ratchet Algorithm features properties that have been commonly available in end-to-end encryption systems for a long time: encryption of contents on the entire way of transport as well as authentication of the remote peer and protection against manipulation of messages. As a hybrid of DH and KDF ratchets, it combines several desired features of both principles. From OTR messaging it takes the properties of forward secrecy and automatically reestablishing secrecy in case of compromise of a session key, forward secrecy with a compromise of the secret persistent main key, and plausible deniability for the authorship of messages. Additionally, it enables session key renewal without interaction with the remote peer by using secondary KDF ratchets. An additional key-derivation step is taken to enable retaining session keys for out-of-order messages without endangering the following keys.

It is said to detect reordering, deletion, and replay of sent messages, and improve forward secrecy properties against passive eavesdropping in comparison to OTR messaging.

Combined with public key infrastructure for the retention of pregenerated one-time keys (prekeys), it allows for the initialization of messaging sessions without the presence of the remote peer (asynchronous communication). The usage of triple Diffie–Hellman key exchange (3-DH) as initial key exchange method improves the deniability properties. An example of this is the Signal Protocol, which combines the Double Ratchet Algorithm, prekeys, and a 3-DH handshake. The protocol provides confidentiality, integrity, authentication, participant consistency, destination validation, forward secrecy, backward secrecy (aka future secrecy), causality preservation, message unlinkability, message repudiation, participation repudiation, and asynchronicity. It does not provide anonymity preservation, and requires servers for the relaying of messages and storing of public key material.

== Functioning ==

Diagram of the working principle

A client attempts to renew session key material interactively with the remote peer using a Diffie-Hellman (DH) ratchet. If this is impossible, the clients renew the session key independently using a hash ratchet. With every message, a client advances one of two hash ratchets—one for sending and one for receiving. These two hash ratchets get seeded with a common secret from a DH ratchet. At the same time it tries to use every opportunity to provide the remote peer with a new public DH value and advance the DH ratchet whenever a new DH value from the remote peer arrives. As soon as a new common secret is established, a new hash ratchet gets initialized.

As cryptographic primitives, the Double Ratchet Algorithm uses

for the DH ratchet
Elliptic curve Diffie-Hellman (ECDH) with Curve25519,
for message authentication codes (MAC, authentication)
Keyed-hash message authentication code (HMAC) based on SHA-256,
for symmetric encryption
the Advanced Encryption Standard (AES), partially in cipher block chaining mode (CBC) with padding as per PKCS #5 and partially in counter mode (CTR) without padding,
for the hash ratchet
HMAC.

== Applications ==
The following is a list of applications that use the Double Ratchet Algorithm or a custom implementation of it.

=== Federated networks ===
- Any client for the Matrix network: Element, GNOME Fractal
- Any client for the XMPP network with OMEMO support: ChatSecure, Conversations, Cryptocat (discontinued), Gajim, Movim, Psi via official plugin, Psi+ via official plugin, libpurple clients such as Pidgin or Finch via experimental plugin, Adium via an Xtra based on the libpurple plugin, Profanity via experimental plugin.

=== Centralized networks ===
The Double Ratchet Algorithm does not attempt to solve the inherent vulnerability of centralized networks to backdoors that introduce flaws in the algorithm implementation, the cryptographical protocol (which the algorithm is part of) or implementation thereof, or unrelated parts of the official application. It has been implemented nonetheless in a number of official clients for various centralized networks:

- Facebook Messenger (Note: Only in "secret conversations") (Note: Via the Signal Protocol)
- G Data Secure Chat
- Google Allo (Note: Only in "incognito mode")
- Google Messages (Note: Only in one-to-one RCS chats)
- Haven
- Pond
- Signal
- Silent Phone (Note: Via the Zina protocol)
- Skype (Note: Only in "private conversations")
- Viber (Note: Viber "uses the same concepts of the "double ratchet" protocol used in Open Whisper Systems Signal application")
- WhatsApp
- Wire (Note: Via the Proteus protocol)

== Literature ==
- Cohn-Gordon, Katriel; Cremers, Cas; Dowling, Benjamin; Garratt, Luke; Stebila, Douglas (25 October 2016). "A Formal Security Analysis of the Signal Messaging Protocol" (PDF). Cryptology ePrint Archive. International Association for Cryptologic Research (IACR).
- Frosch, Tilman; Mainka, Christian; Bader, Christoph; Bergsma, Florian; Schwenk, Jörg; Holz, Thorsten (2014). "How Secure is TextSecure?" (PDF). Cryptology ePrint Archive. International Association for Cryptologic Research (IACR).
- Unger, Nik; Dechand, Sergej; Bonneau, Joseph; Fahl, Sascha; Perl, Henning; Goldberg, Ian Avrum; Smith, Matthew (2015). SoK: Secure Messaging (PDF). Proceedings of the 2015 IEEE Symposium on Security and Privacy. IEEE Computer Society's Technical Committee on Security and Privacy. pp. 232–249. doi:10.1109/SP.2015.22.
