= Signal Foundation =

American non-profit organization

- Signal Technology Foundation
- Predecessor: Open Whisper Systems
- Formation: January 10, 2018; 8 years ago
- Founded: January 10, 2018; 8 years ago
- Founders: Moxie Marlinspike; Brian Acton
- Type: 501(c)(3) nonprofit organization
- Tax ID no.: 82-4506840
- Purpose: Open-source privacy technology
- Headquarters: 650 Castro Street, Suite 120-223
- Location: Mountain View, California
- Region served: Global
- Products: Signal Messenger
- Key people: Brian Acton (Executive Chairman); Meredith Whittaker (President)
- Subsidiaries: Signal Messenger LLC
- Revenue: $29,413,537 (2024)
- Expenses: $38,019,696 (2024)
- Staff: 36 (2020)
- Website: signalfoundation.org

The Signal Technology Foundation, commonly known as the Signal Foundation, is an American non-profit organization founded in 2018 by Moxie Marlinspike and Brian Acton. Its mission is to "protect free expression and enable secure global communication through open source privacy technology." Its subsidiary, Signal Messenger LLC, is responsible for the development of the Signal messaging app and the Signal Protocol.

== History ==
On February 21, 2018, Moxie Marlinspike and WhatsApp co-founder Brian Acton announced the formation of the Signal Foundation, a 501(c)(3) nonprofit organization. The foundation was started with an initial $50 million loan from Acton, who had left WhatsApp's parent company, Facebook, in September 2017. The Freedom of the Press Foundation had previously served as the Signal project's fiscal sponsor and continued to accept donations on behalf of the project while the foundation's non-profit status was pending. By the end of 2018, the loan had increased to $105,000,400, which is due to be repaid on February 28, 2068. The loan is unsecured and at 0% interest.

=== Senior leadership ===
Signal Foundation has been led by a Chairman, which is separate from the leadership roles of Signal Messenger.

==== List of chairmen ====
1. Brian Acton (2018–present)

== People ==
As of June 2023, the Signal Foundation board of directors has five members:

- Amba Kak
- Brian Acton (co-founder, Chairman of Signal Foundation and CEO of Signal Messenger LLC)
- Jay Sullivan
- Katherine Maher
- Meredith Whittaker (president)

Emeritus members:

- Moxie Marlinspike (co-founder)

== Signal Messenger LLC ==
Signal Messenger
- Formation: January 10, 2018; 8 years ago
- Founders: Moxie Marlinspike; Brian Acton
- Type: Limited liability company
- Products: Signal, Signal Protocol
- Key people: Brian Acton (CEO); Aruna Harder (COO); Ehren Kret (CTO)
- Parent organization: Signal Technology Foundation
- Affiliations: Freedom of the Press Foundation
- Website: signal.org

Signal Messenger LLC was founded simultaneously with the Signal Technology Foundation and operates as its subsidiary. It is responsible for the development of the Signal messaging app and the Signal Protocol. Moxie Marlinspike served as Signal Messenger's first CEO until stepping down on January 10, 2022. Brian Acton volunteered to serve as interim CEO while the organization searched for a new CEO. In June 2023, Signal announced that Acton would be staying on as CEO following the search.

=== Senior leadership ===
Along with the Chairman of the Signal Foundation, Signal Messenger has been traditionally led by a CEO. This was until September 2022, when a new role of President was created, which is dedicated to more core lanes of strategy.

==== List of CEOs ====
1. Moxie Marlinspike (2018–2022)
2. Brian Acton (2022–present)

==== List of presidents ====
1. Meredith Whittaker (2022–present)
