= Brian Acton =

American business executive (born 1972)

- Born: 1972 (age 53–54); Michigan, U.S.
- Education: Stanford University (BCS)
- Occupations: Business executive; computer programmer
- Years active: 1992–present
- Known for: Co-founding of WhatsApp and Signal Foundation
- Title: Executive chairperson of Signal Technology Foundation
- Spouse: Tegan Acton
- Website: signalfoundation.org

Brian Acton (born 1972) is an American business executive and computer programmer serving as the executive chairperson of Signal Technology Foundation, which he co-founded with Moxie Marlinspike in 2018. Acton also serves as interim chief executive officer (CEO) of Signal Messenger LLC.

He was formerly employed at Yahoo!. In 2009, Jan Koum and Acton co-founded WhatsApp, a mobile messaging application which was acquired by Facebook in February 2014 for US$19 billion. Acton left WhatsApp in September 2017, to start the Signal Foundation. According to Forbes in 2020, Acton was the 836th-richest person in the world, with a net worth of $2.5 billion.

== Early life and education ==
Acton grew up in Michigan, later moving to Central Florida, where he graduated from Lake Howell High School. He took classes at the University of Central Florida before receiving a full scholarship to study engineering at the University of Pennsylvania. He left after one year to attend Stanford. In 1994, he graduated from Stanford University with a degree in computer science.

== Career ==
In 1992, Acton became a systems administrator for Rockwell International, before transitioning to product testing roles at Apple Inc. and Adobe Systems, he joined Yahoo Inc. in 1996.

=== Yahoo! ===
Two years after Acton joined Yahoo, Jan Koum was hired as an infrastructure engineer shortly after he met Acton while working at Ernst & Young as a security tester. Over the next nine years, the two worked together at Yahoo. Acton lost millions in the dot-com bubble of 2000. In September 2007, Koum and Acton left Yahoo! and took a year off, traveling around South America. They both tried to get jobs at Facebook, but were not hired.

=== WhatsApp ===
In January 2009, Koum bought an iPhone and believed the App Store was about to spawn a whole new industry of apps. He talked to his friend, Alex Fishman, about developing an app. Koum chose the name WhatsApp because it sounded like "what's up", and on February 24, 2009, he incorporated WhatsApp Inc. in California.

In 2014, Koum and Acton sold WhatsApp to Facebook for approximately US$19 billion in cash and stock. Forbes estimated that Acton held over 20% stake in the company, making his net worth around $3.8 billion.

In 2016, Acton led a funding round for Trak N Tell and raised $3.5 million along with two other investors.

In September 2017, Acton left WhatsApp. Acton told Forbes that he left over a dispute with Facebook regarding monetization of WhatsApp, and voluntarily left $850 million in unvested options by leaving a few months before vesting was completed. He also said that he was coached by Facebook executives to mislead European regulators regarding Facebook's intention to merge Facebook and WhatsApp user data.

=== Signal ===
When he left WhatsApp in September 2017, Acton co-founded the Signal Foundation with Moxie Marlinspike, which is dedicated to helping people have access to private communication through an encrypted messaging app. Signal is widely used by journalists and human rights activists.

In February 2018, it was announced that Acton was investing $50 million into Signal. This funding was a loan from Acton to the new non-profit Signal Technology Foundation, created in 2018. By the end of 2018, the loan had increased to $105,000,400, due to be repaid on February 28, 2068. The loan is unsecured and carries nil interest.

On March 20, 2018, Forbes reported that Acton had publicly tweeted support for the #DeleteFacebook movement, in a "new level of public backlash". In November 2019, Acton explained to journalist Steven Levy, that he decided it was time to make his feelings public because there was pressure unfolding against Facebook.

== Other activities ==
=== Philanthropy ===
In 2014, Acton and his wife, Tegan, started the foundation Wildcard Giving, with three sister foundations: Sunlight Giving, Acton Family Giving, and Solidarity Giving. Sunlight Giving is a family foundation supporting the basic services of low-income families with young children, aged five and below, living in the San Francisco Bay Area. It also provides support for safe spaces and organizations working for food security, housing stability, and healthcare access. Sunlight Giving has $470 million in assets. It granted $6.4 million in 2015, $19.2 million in 2016, and $23.6 million in 2017. This private foundation helped to fund Magnify Community, a non-profit organization to redirect philanthropists' giving to nonprofits.

In 2019, Forbes reported that Brian Acton and his wife had given more than $1 billion to charitable causes over their lifetimes.

== Personal life ==
He is married to Tegan Acton and resides in Palo Alto, California.
