= End-to-end encryption =

Secure communications method

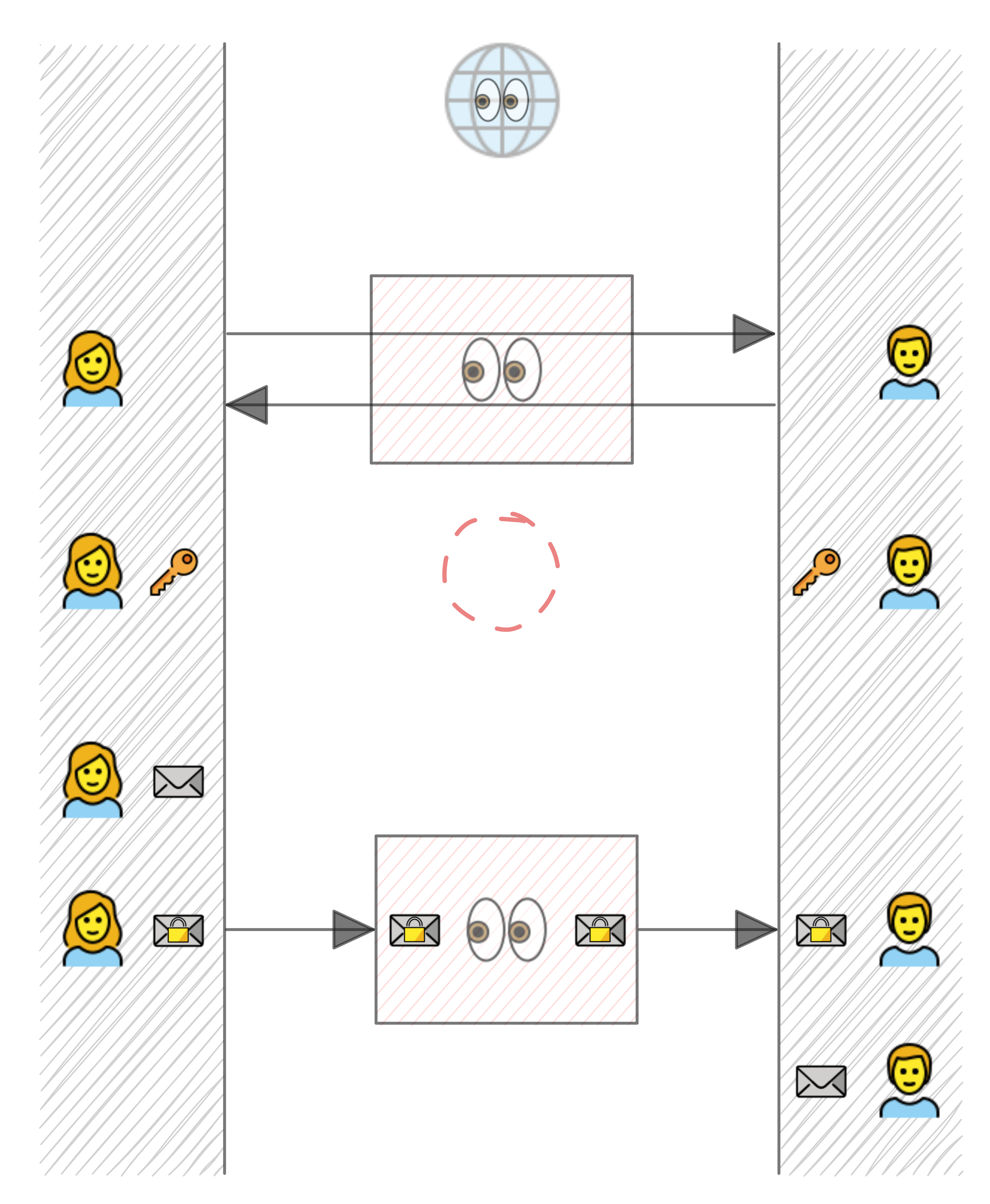
End-to-end encryption ensures that only the sender and recipient can decrypt messages, blocking access by platforms and third parties, which significantly reduces the attack surface.

End-to-end encryption (E2EE) is a method of implementing a secure communication system where only the sender and intended recipients can read the messages. No one else, including the system provider, telecom providers, Internet providers or malicious actors, can access the cryptographic keys needed to read or send messages.

End-to-end encryption prevents data from being read or secretly modified, except by the sender and intended recipients. In many applications, messages are relayed from a sender to some recipients by a service provider. In an E2EE-enabled service, messages are encrypted on the sender's device such that no third party, including the service provider, has the means to decrypt them. The recipients retrieve encrypted messages and decrypt them independently on their own devices. Since third parties cannot decrypt the data being communicated or stored, services with E2EE are better at protecting user data from data breaches and espionage.

Computer security experts, digital freedom organizations, and human rights activists advocate for the use of E2EE due to its security and privacy benefits, including its ability to resist mass surveillance. Popular messaging apps like WhatsApp, iMessage, Facebook Messenger and Signal use end-to-end encryption for chat messages, with some also supporting E2EE of voice and video calls. As of May 2025, WhatsApp is the most widely used E2EE messaging service, with over 3 billion users. Meanwhile, Signal with an estimated 70 million users, is regarded as the current gold standard in secure messaging by cryptographers, protestors and journalists.

Since end-to-end encrypted services cannot offer decrypted messages in response to government requests, the proliferation of E2EE has been met with controversy. Around the world, governments, law enforcement agencies and child protection groups have expressed concerns over its impact on criminal investigations. As of 2025, some governments have successfully passed legislation targeting E2EE, such as Australia's Telecommunications and Other Legislation Amendment Act (2018) and the Online Safety Act (2023) in the UK. Other attempts at restricting E2EE include the EARN IT Act in the US and the Child Sexual Abuse Regulation in the EU. Nevertheless, some government bodies such as the UK's Information Commissioner's Office and the US's Cybersecurity and Infrastructure Security Agency (CISA) have argued for the use of E2EE, with Jeff Greene of the CISA advising that "encryption is your friend" following the discovery of the Salt Typhoon espionage campaign in 2024.

== Definitions ==
End-to-end encryption is a means of ensuring the security of communications in applications like secure messaging. Under E2EE, messages are encrypted on the sender's device such that they can be decoded only by the final recipient's device. In many non-E2EE messaging systems, including email and many chat platforms, messages pass through intermediaries and are stored by a third-party service provider, from which they are retrieved by the recipient. Even if messages are encrypted, they are only encrypted 'in transit', and are thus accessible by the service provider. Server-side disk encryption is also distinct from E2EE because it does not prevent the service provider from viewing the information, as they have the encryption keys and can simply decrypt it.

The term "end-to-end encryption" originally only meant that the communication is never decrypted during its transport from the sender to the receiver. For example, around 2003, E2EE was proposed as an additional layer of encryption for GSM or TETRA, in addition to the existing radio encryption protecting the communication between the mobile device and the network infrastructure. This has been standardized by SFPG for TETRA. Note that in TETRA, the keys are generated by a Key Management Centre (KMC) or a Key Management Facility (KMF), not by the communicating users.

Later, around 2014, the meaning of "end-to-end encryption" started to evolve when WhatsApp encrypted a portion of its network, requiring that not only the communication stays encrypted during transport, but also that the provider of the communication service is not able to decrypt the communications—maliciously or when requested by law enforcement agencies. Similarly, messages must be undecryptable in transit by attackers through man-in-the-middle attacks. This new meaning is now the widely accepted one.

== Motivations ==
The lack of end-to-end encryption can allow service providers to easily provide search and other features, or to scan for illegal and unacceptable content. However, it also means that content can be read by anyone who has access to the data stored by the service provider, by design or via a backdoor. This can be a concern in many cases where privacy is important, such as in governmental and military communications, financial transactions, and when sensitive information such as health and biometric data are sent. If this content were shared without E2EE, a malicious actor or adversarial government could obtain it through unauthorized access or subpoenas targeted at the service provider.

E2EE alone does not guarantee privacy or security. For example, the data may be held unencrypted on the user's own device or accessed through their own app if their credentials are compromised.

== Modern implementations ==
=== Messaging ===
In May 2026, Meta ended support for end-to-end encryption (E2EE) on Instagram, reversing a previous commitment to expand the technology across its messaging services. Meta said it was removing the feature because very few people were opting in to end-to-end encrypted messaging in Instagram DMs. The decision highlighted a conflict between digital privacy and online safety; while child protection organizations supported the change to better identify predatory behavior, privacy advocates argued that removing E2EE compromises user security.

As of 2025, messaging apps like Signal and WhatsApp are designed to exclusively use end-to-end encryption. Both Signal and WhatsApp use the Signal Protocol. Other messaging apps and protocols that support end-to-end encryption include Facebook Messenger, iMessage, Telegram, Matrix and Keybase. Although Telegram supports end-to-end encryption, it has been criticized for not enabling it by default, instead supporting E2EE through opt-in "secret chats". As of 2026, Telegram does not support E2EE for group chats and E2EE is not supported on its desktop clients.

Facebook Messenger first introduced optional end-to-end encryption in 2016 through its "Secret Conversations" feature. In 2022, after controversy over the use of Facebook Messenger messages in a Nebraska criminal case involving an abortion, Meta expanded testing of end-to-end encryption in Messenger. Writing for Wired, technologist Albert Fox Cahn criticized Messenger's approach to end-to-end encryption, which required the user to opt into E2EE for each conversation and split the message thread into two chats which were easy for users to confuse. In December 2023, Facebook announced plans to enable end-to-end encryption by default despite pressure from British law enforcement agencies.

As of 2016, many server-based communications systems did not include end-to-end encryption. These systems can only guarantee the protection of communications between clients and servers, meaning that users have to trust the third parties who are running the servers with the sensitive content. End-to-end encryption is regarded as safer because it reduces the number of parties who might be able to interfere or break the encryption. In the case of instant messaging, users may use a third-party client or plugin to implement an end-to-end encryption scheme over an otherwise non-E2EE protocol.

=== Audio and video conferencing ===
Signal and WhatsApp use end-to-end encryption for audio and video calls. Since 2017, Signal has supported end-to-end encrypted one-to-one video calls. Since 2020, Signal has supported end-to-end encrypted group video calls. In 2024, Discord introduced end-to-end encryption for audio and video calls, voice channels and certain live streams. In March 2026, this encryption became mandatory by default for every voice and video call on the platform—including calls in direct messages, group calls, voice channels and Go Live streams—except for Stage channels, with no opt-in required from users. The rollout used Discord's open-source DAVE protocol, which the company stated had been extended across desktop, mobile, web browsers, gaming consoles and its Social SDK. Discord has stated it has no current plans to extend end-to-end encryption to text messages.

In 2020, after acquiring Keybase, Zoom announced end-to-end encryption would be limited to paid accounts. Following criticism from human rights advocates, Zoom extended the feature to all users with accounts. In 2021, Zoom settled an $85 million class action lawsuit over past misrepresentation about end-to-end encryption. The FTC confirmed Zoom previously retained access to meeting keys.

=== Other uses ===
Some encrypted backup and file sharing services provide client-side encryption. Nextcloud and Mega offer end-to-end encryption of shared files.

The term "end-to-end encryption" is sometimes incorrectly used to describe client-side encryption.

Some non-E2EE systems, such as Lavabit and Hushmail, have described themselves as offering "end-to-end" encryption when they did not.

== Law enforcement and regulation ==
Unsealed 2021 subpoena addressed to Signal Messenger LLC requesting records for a redacted Signal profile name

In 2022, Facebook Messenger came under scrutiny because the messages between a mother and daughter in Nebraska were used to seek criminal charges in an abortion-related case against both of them. The daughter told the police that she had a miscarriage and tried to search for the date of her miscarriage in her Messenger app. Police suspected there could be more information within the messages and obtained and served a warrant against Facebook to gain access. The messages allegedly mentioned the mother obtaining abortion pills for her daughter and then burning the evidence.

While E2EE can offer privacy benefits that make it desirable in consumer-grade services, many businesses have to balance these benefits with their regulatory requirements. For example, many organizations are subject to mandates that require them to be able to decrypt any communication between their employees or between their employees and third parties. This might be needed for archival purposes, for inspection by Data Loss Prevention (DLP) systems, for litigation-related eDiscovery or for detection of malware and other threats in the data streams. For this reason, some enterprise-focused communications and information protection systems might implement encryption in a way that ensures all transmissions are encrypted with the encryption being terminated at their internal systems (on-premises or cloud-based) so they can have access to the information for inspection and processing.

== Challenges ==
=== Man-in-the-middle attacks ===
End-to-end encryption ensures that data is transferred securely between endpoints. But, rather than try to break the encryption, an eavesdropper may impersonate a message recipient (during key exchange or by substituting their public key for the recipient's), so that messages are encrypted with a key known to the attacker. After decrypting the message, the snoop can then encrypt it with a key that they share with the actual recipient, or their public key in case of asymmetric systems, and send the message on again to avoid detection. This is known as a man-in-the-middle attack (MITM).

==== Authentication ====
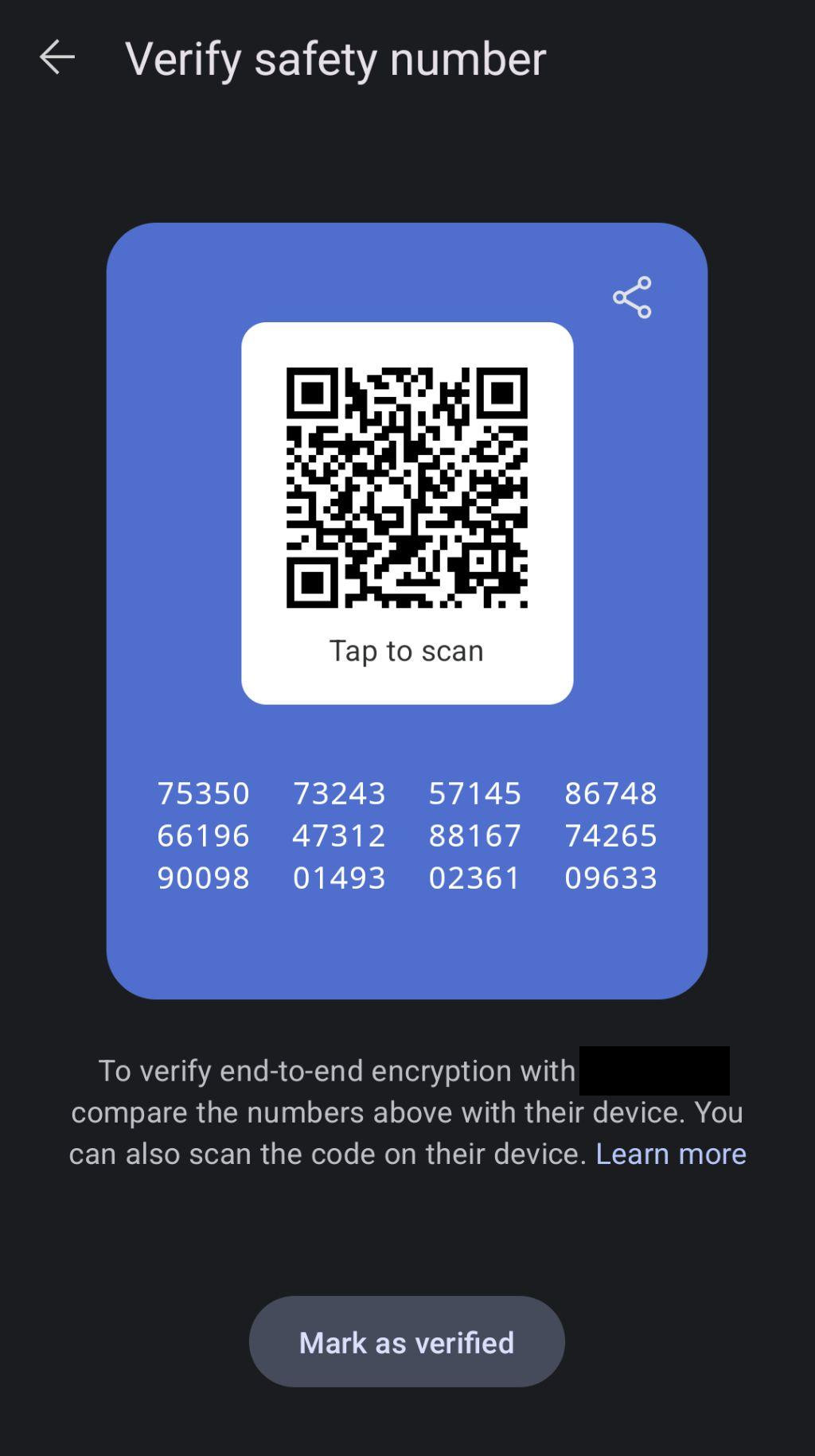
"Verify safety number" screen on Signal Android 7.43.1

Most end-to-end encryption protocols include some form of endpoint authentication specifically to prevent MITM attacks. For example, one could rely on certification authorities or a web of trust. An alternative technique is to generate cryptographic hashes (fingerprints) based on the communicating users' public keys or shared secret keys. The parties compare their fingerprints using an outside (out-of-band) communication channel that guarantees integrity and authenticity of communication (but not necessarily secrecy), before starting their conversation. If the fingerprints match, there is, in theory, no man in the middle.

When displayed for human inspection, fingerprints usually use some form of binary-to-text encoding. These strings are then formatted into groups of characters for readability. Some clients instead display a natural language representation of the fingerprint. As the approach consists of a one-to-one mapping between fingerprint blocks and words, there is no loss in entropy. The protocol may choose to display words in the user's native (system) language. This can, however, make cross-language comparisons prone to errors.

In order to improve localization, some protocols have chosen to display fingerprints as base 10 strings instead of more error prone hexadecimal or natural language strings.

Modern messaging applications can also display fingerprints as QR codes that users can scan off each other's devices.

=== Endpoint security ===
The end-to-end encryption paradigm does not directly address risks at the communications endpoints themselves. Each user's computer can still be hacked to steal their cryptographic key (to create a MITM attack) or simply read the recipients' decrypted messages both in real time and from log files. Even the most perfectly encrypted communication pipe is only as secure as the mailbox on the other end. Major attempts to increase endpoint security have been to isolate key generation, storage and cryptographic operations to a smart card such as Google's Project Vault. However, since plaintext input and output are still visible to the host system, malware can monitor conversations in real time. A more robust approach is to isolate all sensitive data to a fully air gapped computer. However, as Bruce Schneier points out, Stuxnet developed by US and Israel successfully jumped air gap and reached Natanz nuclear plant's network in Iran. To deal with key exfiltration with malware, one approach is to split the Trusted Computing Base behind two unidirectionally connected computers that prevent either insertion of malware, or exfiltration of sensitive data with inserted malware.

=== Backdoors ===
A backdoor is usually a secret method of bypassing normal authentication or encryption in a computer system, a product, an embedded device, etc. Companies may also willingly or unwillingly introduce backdoors to their software that help subvert key negotiation or bypass encryption altogether. In 2013, information leaked by Edward Snowden showed that Skype had a backdoor which allowed Microsoft to hand over their users' messages to the NSA despite the fact that those messages were officially end-to-end encrypted.

Following terrorist attacks in San Bernardino in 2015 and Pensacola in 2019, the FBI requested backdoors to Apple's iPhone software. The company, however, refused to create a backdoor for the government, citing concern that such a tool could pose risk for its consumers' privacy.

== See also ==
- Comparison of instant messaging protocols
- Comparison of VoIP software § Secure VoIP software – a table overview of VoIP clients that offer end-to-end encryption
- Mass surveillance
- Human rights and encryption
- Diffie–Hellman key exchange – method of negotiating secret keys for the communicating users without sharing them with observers, such as the communication system provider
- End-to-end auditable voting
- Point-to-point encryption
- Crypto Wars
