= Coyne (surname) =

- Pronunciation: /ˈkɔɪn/

Origin
- Region of origin: Ireland

Coyne is a surname of Irish origin anglicised from the Gaelic Ó Cadhain meaning "descendant of Cadhan".

Notable people with the surname include:

- Andre Coyne, dam engineer
- Andrew Coyne, journalist
- Bernard Coyne (bishop), Bishop of Elphin from 1913 to 1926
- Bernard Coyne (giant) (1897–1921), American who is one of only 20 individuals in medical history to have stood 240 cm (8 feet) or more
- Brian Coyne (born 1959), Scottish (soccer) football player and manager
- Christopher Coyne (disambiguation), multiple people

- Christopher J. Coyne (born 1958), bishop of the Roman Catholic Diocese of Burlington, Vermont
- Christopher Coyne (professor) (born 1977), professor of economics
- Chris Coyne (born 1978), Australian (soccer) footballer
- Chris Coyne, co-founded the websites OkCupid, keybase and SparkNotes

- Dale Coyne, auto racer
- Danny Coyne, footballer
- Deborah Coyne, lawyer, professor and author
- Frank J. Coyne, CEO of Insurance Services Office, Inc.
- Gary Coyne (born 1961), Australian rugby league footballer
- George Coyne, priest and astronomer
- James Coyne (disambiguation), several people

- James C. Coyne (1947–2024), American psychologist
- James Elliott Coyne (1910–2012), governor of the Bank of Canada, son of J. Bowes
- James Henry Coyne (1849–1942), Canadian lawyer and historian
- James K. Coyne III (born 1946), U.S. Representative from Pennsylvania

- Jamie Coyne (born 1982), Australian (soccer) footballer, brother of Chris Coyne
- Jeanne Coyne, Broadway dancer and choreographer
- Jerry Coyne, American professor of biology
- John Coyne (disambiguation), several people

- John Coyne (politician) (1836–1873), Canadian barrister and politician
- John Coyne (writer) (born 1937), American writer of horror novels
- John Henry Coyne aka Harry Coyne (1865–1926), Queensland politician
- John M. Coyne (1916–2014), former mayor of Brooklyn, Ohio
- John Coyne (footballer) (born 1951), English-born football (soccer) player who played for Australia
- John N. Coyne (1839–1907), American Civil War soldier

- Joseph Coyne, American stage actor who achieved fame in musical comedy
- Joseph Stirling Coyne, Prolific British playwright from the mid-nineteenth century
- Joshua Coyne, American classical musician
- Kevin Coyne, composer, writer and painter
- Mark Coyne (musician), American musician
- Mark Coyne (rugby league), Australian rugby league footballer
- Máirtín Ó Cadhain, Irish-language modernist writer
- Michael L. Coyne, Associate Dean and Law Professor at the Massachusetts School of Law
- Paul Coyne, TV & film producer
- Peter Coyne (disambiguation), several people with that name

- Peter Coyne (footballer) (born 1958), English footballer
- Peter Coyne (politician) (1917–2001), Australian politician
- Peter Coyne (rugby league) (born 1964), Australian rugby league player

- Richard Coyne, Professor of Architectural Computing
- Thelma Coyne, tennis player
- Tiffany Coyne, American model
- Wayne Coyne, musician
- William J. Coyne, American politician
- Evan Coyne Maloney, documentary filmmaker and video blogger
- Lydia Coyne Fletcher (1853–1904), Irish-American playwright, novelist

Fictional characters

- Declan Coyne, in Degrassi: The Next Generation
- Fiona Coyne, in Degrassi: The Next Generation
- Joe Coyne, aka "Penny Plunderer", a villain appearing in Batman comics

== See also ==
- Kyne (surname)
