= Kine =

Kine or KINE may refer to:

== Radio and TV stations ==
- KINE-FM, a radio station (105.1 FM) licensed to Honolulu, Hawaii, United States
- KINE (AM), a radio station (1330 AM) licensed to Kingsville, Texas, United States
- KINE-LP, a defunct low-power television station (channel 44) formerly licensed to Robstown, Texas

== People ==
- Simon Kine, 13th-century Norwegian liegeman and steward
- Starlee Kine, American public radio producer and writer
- Fatou Kiné Camara, Senegalese lawyer and women's rights campaigner
- Kine Beate Bjørnås (born 1980), Norwegian cross-country skier
- Kine Hellebust, Norwegian singer, actress and writer
- Kiné Kirama Fall, Senegalese poet
- Kine Ludvigsen (born 1980), Norwegian singer
- Kine Elisabeth Steinsvik, Norwegian judge
- Kine Hallan Steiwer, Norwegian orienteering competitor
- Kine Asper Vistnes (born 1977), Norwegian trade unionist

== Other uses ==
- Da kine, a Hawaiian Pidgin placeholder word
- Kine Exakta, a camera
- Kine Weekly (Kinematograph Weekly), British film industry trade magazine
- Kine (unit), an archaic unit for velocity
- An archaic plural for cow
- A pestle used with the Japanese usu
- Kine, a sunfish-like character in the Kirby franchise
- Kine, the first book of The Kine Saga trilogy, later republished as Marshworld
- Abbreviation of Kinescope, the recording of a television program by filming the picture from a video monitor

== See also ==
- Kyne (disambiguation)
