= Kyne =

Kyne may refer to:

- Kyne (drag queen) (born 1998), Canadian drag queen
- Kyne (surname), an Irish surname
- USS Kyne, a Cannon-class destroyer escort
- KYNE, a television station in Omaha, Nebraska
- Landzeal Group Ltd v Kyne, a New Zealand court case

== See also ==
- Kynes, a surname
