= Little Dipper (Memphis Kiddie Park) =

Children's roller coaster at Memphis Kiddie Park

- Little Dipper in May 2016

Memphis Kiddie Park
- Location: Memphis Kiddie Park
- Coordinates: 41.440549°N 81.757652°W
- Status: Operating
- Opening date: April 1952

General statistics
- Type: Steel
- Manufacturer: Allan Herschell Company
- Designer: The Allan Herschell Company
- Model: Little Dipper
- Lift/launch system: Chain lift hill
- Trains: Single train with 3 cars; riders arranged 2 across in 2 rows for a total of 12 riders per train
- Little Dipper at RCDB

Little Dipper is a children's steel roller coaster located at Memphis Kiddie Park in Brooklyn, Ohio.

The coaster was built by the Allan Herschell Company and began operating in April 1952. In the 1970s, the original train was replaced with a newer one.

In June 2000, American Coaster Enthusiasts (ACE) honored Little Dipper with a plaque near its entrance in recognition of "[the coaster] being the oldest original operating steel coaster at the same location in North America, Opening Day May 10, 1952." This award was given erroneously, as Little Dipper at Conneaut Lake Park, a ride of the same model, has operated in its original location since 1950.

For the 2006 season, the train was repainted. The ride was not in operation during the 2020 season, as the park was closed due to the COVID-19 pandemic.

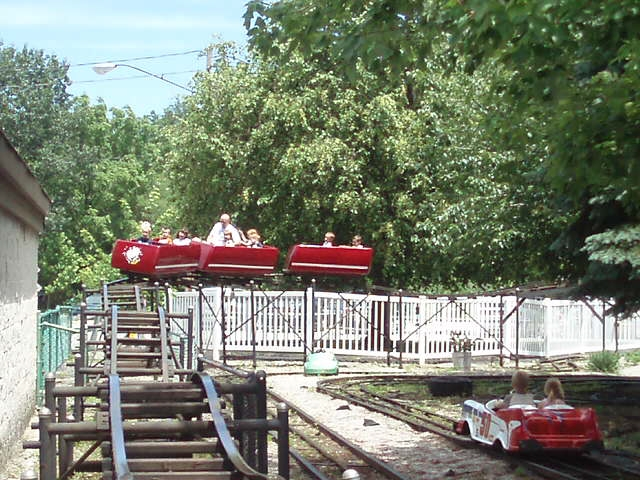
The ride in 2008

The coaster has one three-car train. Riders are seated two across with two rows per car, giving the coaster a capacity of 12 riders per cycle.
