= Mynigma =

Email client

- Developer: Mynigma UG (haftungsbeschränkt)
- Initial release: September 2014
- Written in: Objective-C (iOS, macOS), Java (Android), C# (Outlook)
- Operating system: iOS, macOS, Android
- Available in: English, German, French
- Type: Encrypted email
- License: GPL v3 open-source software
- Website: Mynigma's website

Mynigma (also known as M) is an email client with built-in encryption. It is free for personal use.

The Name “Mynigma” derives from the ancient Greek „Ainigma“ (αἴνιγμα, „Riddle“).

== Functionality ==
Mynigma's core feature is an encryption mechanism that activates automatically when both parties use the client.

With its focus on usability and automation, Mynigma aims to make encryption available specifically to non-technical users.

== Platforms ==
A proof-of-concept app is currently available for Mac and iOS. The most recent version, as well as an Outlook plug-in, are in closed beta. Programs for other platforms like Android are also being developed.

== Awards ==
In 2015, Mynigma received the CeBIT Innovation Award for its unique approach to combining security with usability. The company also finished runner-up in the Gründerpreis der Berliner Sparkasse competition.

== Name changes ==
Due to possible confusion with the meanwhile ceased instant messenger MyEnigma, the program was renamed M in March 2015. Following the announcement of Facebook M in August 2015, the name was changed back to Mynigma.

== Privacy ==
The personal-use version of the program is peer-to-peer. As it does not connect to a central server, it collects no user or usage data.

== Security ==
Mynigma uses end-to-end encryption. The keys required for decryption are stored only on the users' devices.

The encryption format is public and the program's source code is available under a GPL licence.

It uses the algorithms RSA (4096 bit, OAEP padding), AES-128 (CBC with random IV) and SHA-512. Its crypto container is provably CCA secure and protects subject lines as well as message body and attachments.

== Man-in-the-middle prevention ==
Like any trust-on-first-use system, Mynigma may be subject to a man-in-the-middle attack. This can be prevented by comparing a fingerprint (e.g. over the phone) or scanning a QR code.

== Press coverage ==
Mynigma has been featured in various national newspapers, including Tagesspiegel, FAZ and Die Welt. It appears in the sixth issue of The Hundert magazine.
