= Christopher Coyne =

Christopher Coyne may refer to:

- Christopher J. Coyne (born 1958), archbishop of the Roman Catholic Archdiocese of Hartford, Connecticut
- Christopher Coyne (professor) (born 1977), professor of economics
- Chris Coyne (born 1978), Australian (soccer) footballer
- Chris Coyne, Internet entrepreneur who co-founded the websites OkCupid, keybase and SparkNotes

== See also ==
- Coyne (surname)
