= List of information technology initialisms =

The table below lists information technology initialisms and acronyms in common and current usage. These acronyms are used to discuss LAN, internet, WAN, routing and switching protocols, and their applicable organizations. The table contains only current, common, non-proprietary initialisms that are specific to information technology. Most of these initialisms appear in IT career certification exams such as CompTIA A+.

Abbreviation	Meaning	Primary Applicability	Normative Reference
ACK	Acknowledgement	Transport and other layers	TCP/IP, for example. RFC 793
ACL	Access control list	Security, application layer	Access control list, Cisco overview
ADSL	Asymmetric digital subscriber line	Telecom	ITU-T G.992.5 Annex M, for example
AES	Advanced Encryption Standard	Security	U.S. FIPS PUB 197
ANSI	American National Standards Institute	Organization	ANSI
API	Application Programming Interface	Software	API
ARP	Address Resolution Protocol	Link layer	RFC 1122
ATM	Asynchronous Transfer Mode	Telecom	ATM cell description
BGP	Border Gateway Protocol (routing protocol)	Application layer, Routers	RFC 4271
BSS	Basic service set (Wi-Fi)	Wireless	IEEE Std 802.11-2007
CAT	Category (e.g. CAT-5 cable)	Physical layer	ANSI/TIA/EIA-568-B.1-2001
CCITT (obs.)	Standards organization that has been replaced by ITU-T	Organization	ITU-T
CHAP	Challenge-Handshake Authentication Protocol (PPP)	Security, telecom	RFC 1994
CIDR	Classless Inter-Domain Routing	Architecture	RFC 1518 RFC 1519
CIR	Committed Information Rate (Frame Relay)	Telecom	RFC 1490 RFC 1973 RFC 2427
CLI	Command line interpreter	Hardware	Catalyst 6500 Series Command Reference, 7.6, for example
CPE	Customer premises equipment	Telecom	Telecom Glossary
CPU	Central processing Unit	Microprocessor	Wikipedia
CRC	Cyclic redundancy check	Link and other layers	24 References here.
CRC-16-CCITT	Cyclic redundancy check (X.25, HDLC)	Link layers	Reference on CRC page.
CRT	Cathode Ray Tube	Television set, Computer Monitor	Cathode ray tube
CSMA/CA	Carrier sense multiple access / collision avoidance	Wireless	IEEE Std 802.11 Downloads
CSMA/CD	Carrier sense multiple access / collision detection	Physical layer	IEEE Std 802.3TM-2002
CSU/DSU	Channel service unit / data service unit	Telecom	Telecom Glossary
CMOS	Complementary metal-oxide semiconductor	Utility	CMOS
DAM	Database activity monitoring	Security	Database activity monitoring
DAM	Digital asset management	Internet Layer	Digital asset management
DCE	Data communications equipment	Telecom	Telecom Glossary
DEC (obs.)	Digital Equipment Corporation	Organization	Digital Equipment Corporation formally Purchased by Compaq in 1998. Merged with Hewlett-Packard 2002.
DES	Data Encryption Standard (obs. See AES)	Security	Federal Information Processing Standard (FIPS) FIPS-46-3
DHCP	Dynamic Host Configuration Protocol	Application layer, Internet Layer	RFC 2131 and others
DIMM	Dual In-line Memory Module	Hardware	DIMM
DNS	Domain Name System	Application layer	Over 30 RFCs here.
DRAM	Dynamic random-access memory	Hardware	Dynamic random-access memory
DSL	Digital subscriber line	Telecom	Telecom Glossary
DSLAM	Digital subscriber line access multiplexer	Telecom	Telecom Glossary (proposed)
DTE	Data Terminal Equipment	Telecom	Telecom Glossary
DMI	Desktop Management Interface	Utility	Desktop Management Interface
EHA	Ethernet Hardware Address (MAC address)	Link layer	IEEE Std 802 IEEE OUI Assignments
EIA	Electronics Industry Alliance	Organization	EIA
EIGRP	Enhanced Interior Gateway Routing Protocol	Internet Layer	Cisco Doc ID: 16406
EMAC	Ethernet Media Access Control	Link Layer	
EOF	End Of Frame (HDLC, etc.)	Link layer	HDLC framing
ESS	Extended service set (Wi-Fi group)	Wireless	IEEE Std 802.11-2007
FCC	Federal Communications Commission (US)	Organization	US FCC
FCS	Frame check sequence (Ethernet)	Link layer	Ethernet Frame IEEE Std 802.3
FDDI	Fiber Distributed Data Interface	Link layer	American National Standards Institute X3T9.5 (now X3T12), ISO/IEC 9314-x
FTP	File Transfer Protocol	Application layer	RFC 959 and others
GBIC	Gigabit interface converter	Hardware	Seagate Specification
gbps	Gigabit per second	Physical layer	Gigabit per second
GEPOF	Gigabit Ethernet (over) Plastic Optical Fiber	Physical layer	IEEE P802.3bv
GMAC	Gigabit Ethernet Media Access Control	Link Layer	
HDLC	High-level Data Link Control	Link layer	ISO 13239
HTTP	HyperText Transfer Protocol	Application layer	W3C Change History for HTTP
HTTPS	HyperText Transfer Protocol Secure	Transport and other layers	SSL 3.0 Specification
IaaS	Infrastructure as a service	Cloud Services	IaaS Microsoft Docs
IANA	Internet Assigned Number Authority	Organization	IANA
ICaaS	Integration Capability as a Service	Organization	ICaaS
ICMP	Internet Control Message Protocol	Internet Layer	RFC 792
IDF	Intermediate distribution frame	Physical layer	Structured cabling or Telecom Glossary
IDS	Intrusion Detection System	Security	Wikipedia
IEEE	Institute for Electrical and Electronic Engineers	Organization	IEEE
IETF	Internet Engineering Task Force	Organization	IETF
IMAP	Internet Message Access Protocol	Application layer	RFC 3501
IP	Internet Protocol	Internet Layer	RFC 791 RFC 1606
IPS	Intrusion prevention system	Security	"NIST - Guide to Intrusion Detection and Prevention Systems (IDPS)". 2007-02. Retrieved 2010-08-24.
IS-IS	Intermediate System to Intermediate System (routing protocol)	Internet Layer	ISO/IEC 10589:2002
ISDN	Integrated Services Digital Network	Telecom	IEC Area 716-xx
ISP	Internet service provider	Telecom	Telecom Glossary
ITU-T	International Telecommunication Union	Organization	http://www.itu.int
kbps	Kilobit per second	Physical layer	Kilobit per second
LACP	Link Aggregation Control Protocol	Data link layer	
LAN	Local area network	Link and other layers	Telecom Glossary
LAPB	Link Access Procedure, Balanced (x.25)	Telecom	ITU-T Recommendation X.222
LAPF	Link-access procedure for Frame Relay	Telecom	RFC 1490
LLC	Logical link control	Link layer	Telecom Glossary
MAC	Media access control	Link layer	IEEE Std 802.3 and 802.11, for example
MAM	Media access management (related to Digital asset management)	Internet layer	Wikipedia
MAN	Metropolitan area network	Telecom	Telecom Glossary
Mbps	Megabits per second	Physical layer	Megabit_per_second
MC	Multiple choice	IT Professional Certification	About certification exams
MDF	Main distribution frame	Physical layer	Glossary See also Structured cabling
MIB	Management information base (SNMP)	Application layer	RFC 3418
MII	Media-independent Interface	Link layer	
MoCA	Multimedia over Coax Alliance	Organization	Multimedia over Coax Alliance
MPLS	Multiprotocol Label Switching	network technology	
MTU	Maximum Transmission Unit	Multiple layers	
NAC	Network access control	Link and other layers	IEEE 802.1x
NAS	Network-attached storage	Hardware / Storage	Computer data storage
NAT	Network Address Translation	Internet Layer	Cisco Internet Protocol Journal: A look Inside Network Address Translators
NBMA	Non-Broadcast Multiple Access (e.g. Frame Relay ATM)	Telecom	See ATM, Frame Relay and X.25, for examples.
NIC	Network Interface Card	Physical layer	Telecom Glossary
NRZ	Non-return-to-zero	Physical layer	Federal Standard 1037C
NRZI	Non-return to zero inverted	Physical layer	Federal Standard 1037C
NVRAM	Non-volatile RAM	Hardware	Sample vendor data here
OSI	Open System Interconnect (joint ISO and ITU standard)	Organization	ISO/IEC 9594-5:2005 Open Systems Interconnection Protocol Specifications
OSPF	Open Shortest Path First (routing protocol)	Internet Layer	RFC 2238
OUI	Organization Unique Identifier	Link and other layers	IEEE OUI Assignments
PAP	Password authentication protocol	Security	RFC 1334
PAT	Port address translation	Internet Layer	RFC 1918
PaaS	Platform as a service	Cloud Computing/Service	Platform as a service
PC	Personal computer (host)	Hardware	
PIM	Personal information manager	Software category	
PCM	Pulse-code modulation	Physical layer	ITU-T G.711
PDU	Protocol data unit (such as segment, packet, frame, etc.)	Multiple layers	Fed Std 1037C
POP3	Post Office Protocol, version 3	Application layer	RFC 1939
POP	Point of presence	Telecom	Telecom Glossary
POST	Power-on self test	Hardware	Cisco Catalyst 2800 User Guide, for example
POTS	Plain old telephone service	Telecom	Telecom Glossary
PPP	Point-to-point Protocol	Telecom	RFC 1661
PPTP	Point-to-Point Tunneling Protocol	Telecom	RFC 2637
PTT	Public Telephone and Telegraph	Telecom	Telecom Glossary or Free Dictionary
PVST	Per-VLAN Spanning Tree	Link layer	Cisco's introduction to Spanning Tree Protocol
RADIUS	Remote Authentication Dial-In User Service	Security	RFC 2865
RAM	Random Access Memory	Physical layer	Telecom Glossary
RARP	Reverse ARP	Link layer	RFC 903
RIMM	Rambus In-line Memory Module	Hardware	Wikipedia
RFC	Request for Comments	Multiple layers	IETF's RFC Index
RIP	Routing Information Protocol	Internet Layer	RFC 2453, for RIP version 2
RLL	Run-Length Limited	Physical layer	RLL is used in a wide range of encodings.
ROM	Read-Only Memory	Hardware	Telecom Glossary
RSTP	Rapid Spanning Tree Protocol	Link layer	IEEE 802.1w - Rapid Reconfiguration of Spanning Tree
RTP	Real-time Transport Protocol	Application layer	RFC 3550
SaaS	Software as a service	Cloud Computing/Service	Software as a service Microsoft Docs
SDLC	Synchronous Data Link Control	Link layer	Cisco Technology Handbook: SDLC and Derivatives
SDN	Software-defined networking	Architecture	Software-defined networking
SFD	Start-of-frame delimiter (Ethernet, HDLC, etc.)	Link layer	IEEE 802.3 (Ethernet), or RFC 2687 (HDLC), for examples
SFP	Small Form-factor Pluggable	Hardware	Seagate Specification
S-HTTP	Secure HTTP (rarely used)	Transport and other layers	RFC 2660 See also https
SLARP	Serial Line ARP (Address Resolution Protocol)	Link and other layers	Archived Cisco Serial Line Encapsulation extension
SLIP	Serial Line Internet Protocol (obs.)	Telecom	RFC 1055
SIMM	Single In-line Memory Module	Hardware	Wikipedia
SMTP	Simple Mail Transfer Protocol	Application layer	RFC 5321
SNA	Systems Network Architecture (IBM)	Multiple layers	SNA Protocol Suite
SNAP	SubNet Access Protocol	Link layer	IEEE 802 Overview and Architecture
SNMP	Simple Network Management Protocol	Application layer	RFC 1155, RFC 3410 thru RFC 3418 and others
SOF	Start of frame	Link layer	IEEE 802.3 (Ethernet), or RFC 2687 (HDLC), for examples
SRAM	Static random access memory	Hardware	PC Guide's Definition
SSH	Secure shell	Application layer	RFC 4252
SSID	Service set identifier (Wi-Fi)	Wireless	IEEE 802.11
STP	Spanning Tree Protocol	Link layer	Cisco's Introduction to Spanning Tree Protocol
SYN (TCP)	Synchronization	Link and other layers	RFC 793 and many others
TCP/IP	Transmission Control Protocol/Internet Protocol	Transport layer	RFC 793 and many others
TDM	Time-division multiplexing	Physical layer	Fed Std 1037C
TFTP	Trivial File Transfer Protocol	Application layer	RFC 1350
TIA	Telecommunications Industry Alliance	Organization	Telecommunications Industry Association
TOFU	Trust On First Use	Security	Improving SSH-style Host Authentication with Multi-Path Probing
UDP	User Datagram Protocol	Transport layer	RFC 768
URL	Uniform Resource Locator	Web address	URL spec (1994)
USB	Universal Serial Bus	Physical and other layers	USB 3.0 Specification
UTP	Unshielded twisted pair	Physical	Many versions are defined by TIA, such as: TIA-568-B
VC	Virtual circuit	Transport and other layers	Telecom Glossary
VLAN	Virtual local area network	Link layer	IEEE 802.1Q
VLSM	Variable-length subnet masking	Architecture	RFC 1518 RFC 1519
VM	Virtual machine	virtualization/emulation	Virtual machine
VPN	Virtual private network	Application layer	Virtual Private Network Consortium
W3C	World Wide Web Consortium	Organization	W3C
WAN	Wide-area network	Telecom	Telecom Glossary
WEP	Wired Equivalent Privacy	Wireless	IEEE 802.11
Wi-Fi	An implementation of IEEE wireless communication standard 802.11	Wireless	Wi-Fi Alliance
WLC	Wireless LAN Controller	Wireless	Cisco
WPA	Wi-Fi Protected Access	Security	IEEE 802.11i
www	World Wide Web	Architecture	W3C Consortium

== See also ==
- List of computing and IT abbreviations
