= John Coyne =

John Coyne is the name of:

- John Coyne (politician) (1836–1873), Canadian barrister and politician
- John Coyne (writer) (born 1937), American writer of horror novels
- John M. Coyne (1916–2014), former mayor of Brooklyn, Ohio
- John Coyne (soccer) (born 1951), English-born football (soccer) player who played for Australia
- John N. Coyne (1839–1907), American Civil War soldier
- John F. Coyne, former CEO of Western Digital, retired 2013
