= Steel roller coaster =

Type of coaster with steel track

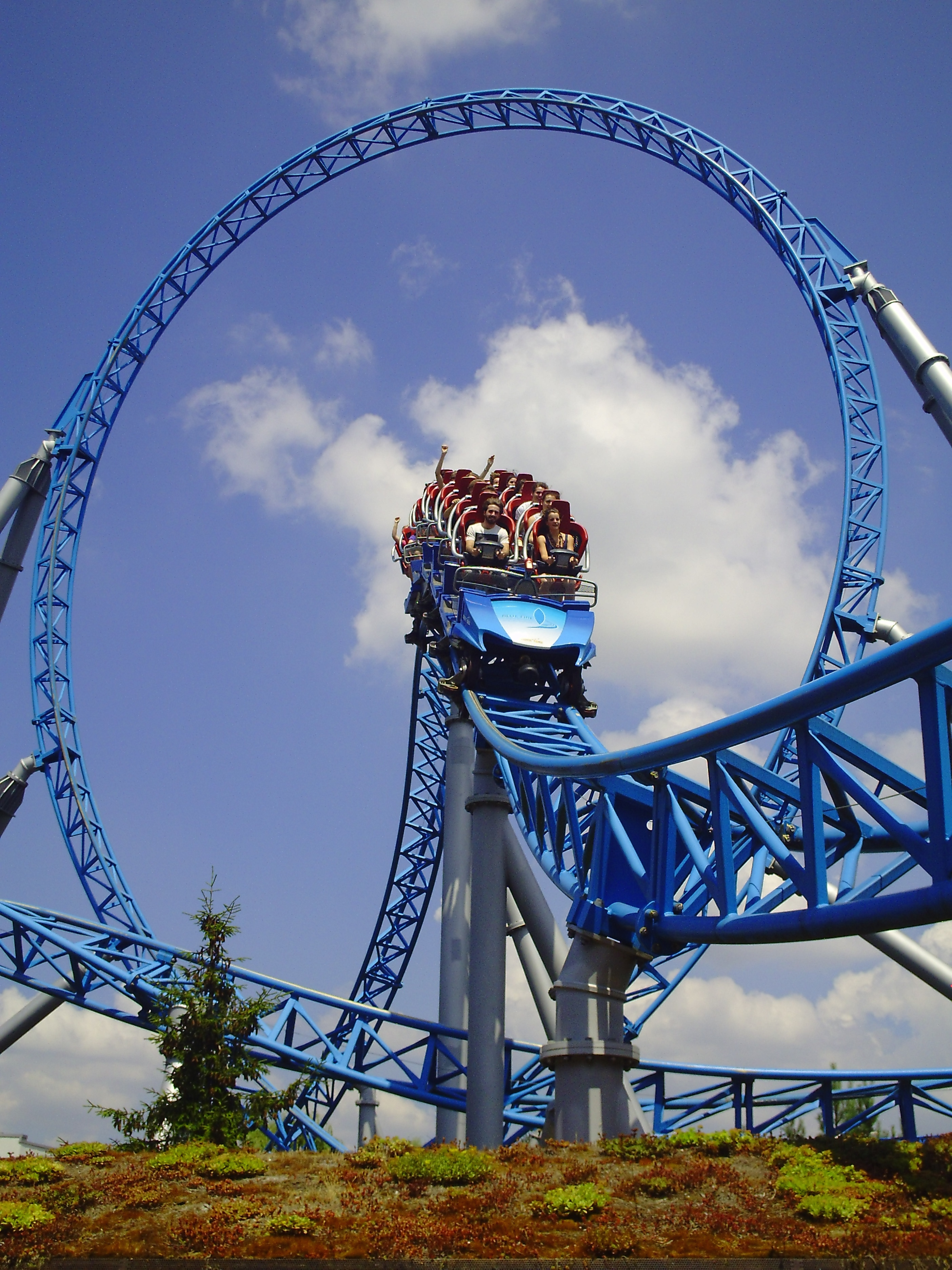
Blue Fire, an inverting launched roller coaster, at Europa-Park, Germany

A steel roller coaster is a type of roller coaster classified by its steel track, which consists of long steel tubes that are run in pairs, supported by larger steel columns or beams. Trains running along the track typically rely on wheels made of polyurethane or nylon to keep each train car anchored to the track. The introduction of tubular steel drastically changed roller coaster innovation, allowing for greater speeds, higher drops, and more intense elements such as inversions.

Arrow Dynamics is credited with inventing tubular steel track and introducing the first modern steel coaster with the opening of Matterhorn Bobsleds at Disneyland in 1959. Older steel-tracked coasters existed previously in a simpler form, such as Little Dipper at Memphis Kiddie Park in Brooklyn, Ohio, which is the oldest operating steel coaster in North America. The oldest in the world is Montaña Suiza at Parque de Atracciones Monte Igueldo (Spain), which has been operating since 1928.

== Characteristics ==
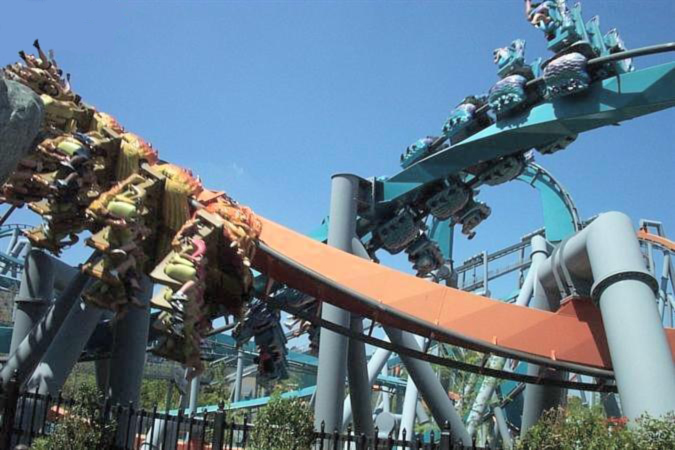
Dragon Challenge was a unique inverted roller coaster that featured a dueling layout, located at Islands of Adventure in Orlando, Florida

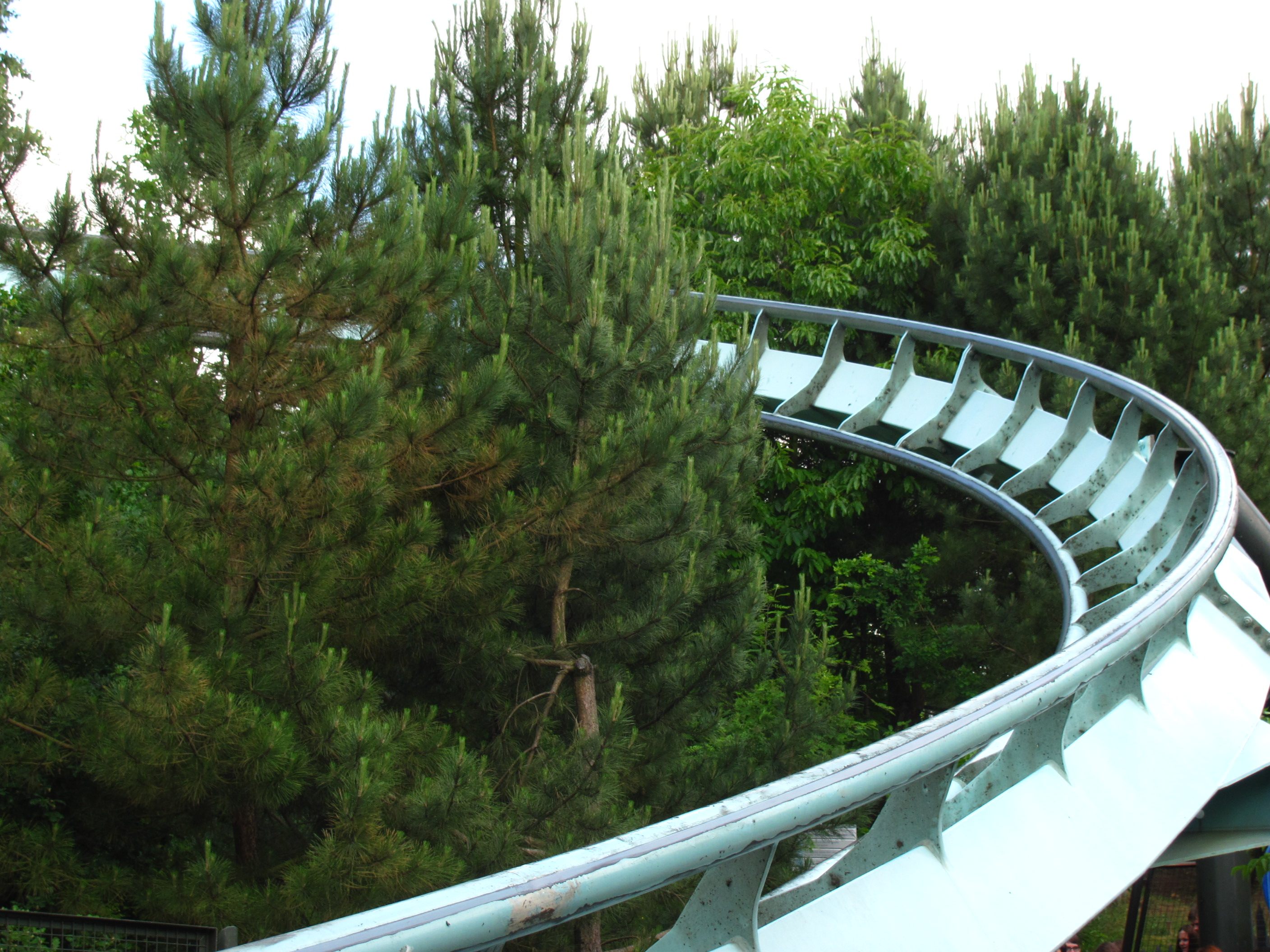
A close-up of the tubular steel tracks of Galactica at Alton Towers

- Steel coasters can generally provide a smoother ride experience than their wooden counterparts, and due to their strength, can have more complex ride elements, achieve greater speeds, and feature higher drops. Despite the advantages, wooden roller coasters continue to be built and still remain popular in the industry for providing a different riding experience.
- Most world records for height, speed, and length are typically held by steel roller coasters.
- Some designs combine steel tracks with wooden frames, or vice versa, which are referred to as hybrid roller coasters. In some cases, the original wooden track on a wooden coaster is retrofitted with steel track during a refurbishment, with one of the first being New Texas Giant at Six Flags Over Texas. One of the most popular conversions was Steel Vengeance at Cedar Point.

There are various types of steel coaster models and designs, including flying, inverted, floorless, and suspended.

== Notable steel roller coasters ==
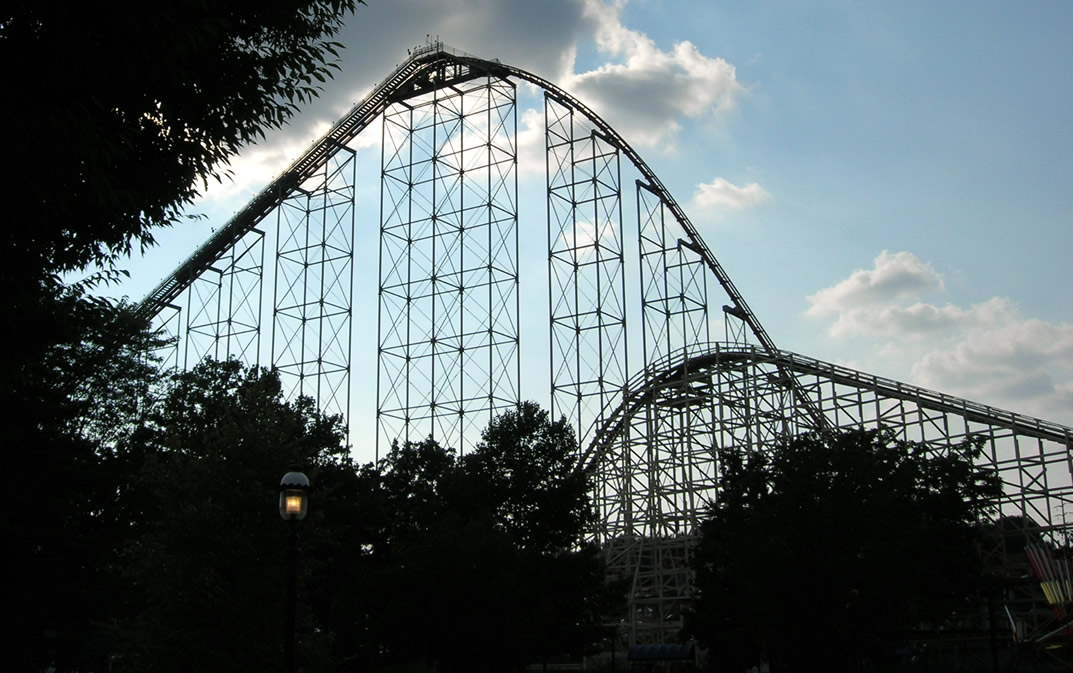
Dorney Park and Wildwater Kingdom's Steel Force and Thunderhawk roller coasters, just outside Allentown, Pennsylvania. Steel Force has a first drop of 205 feet (62 m) and a top speed of 75 miles per hour (121 km/h).

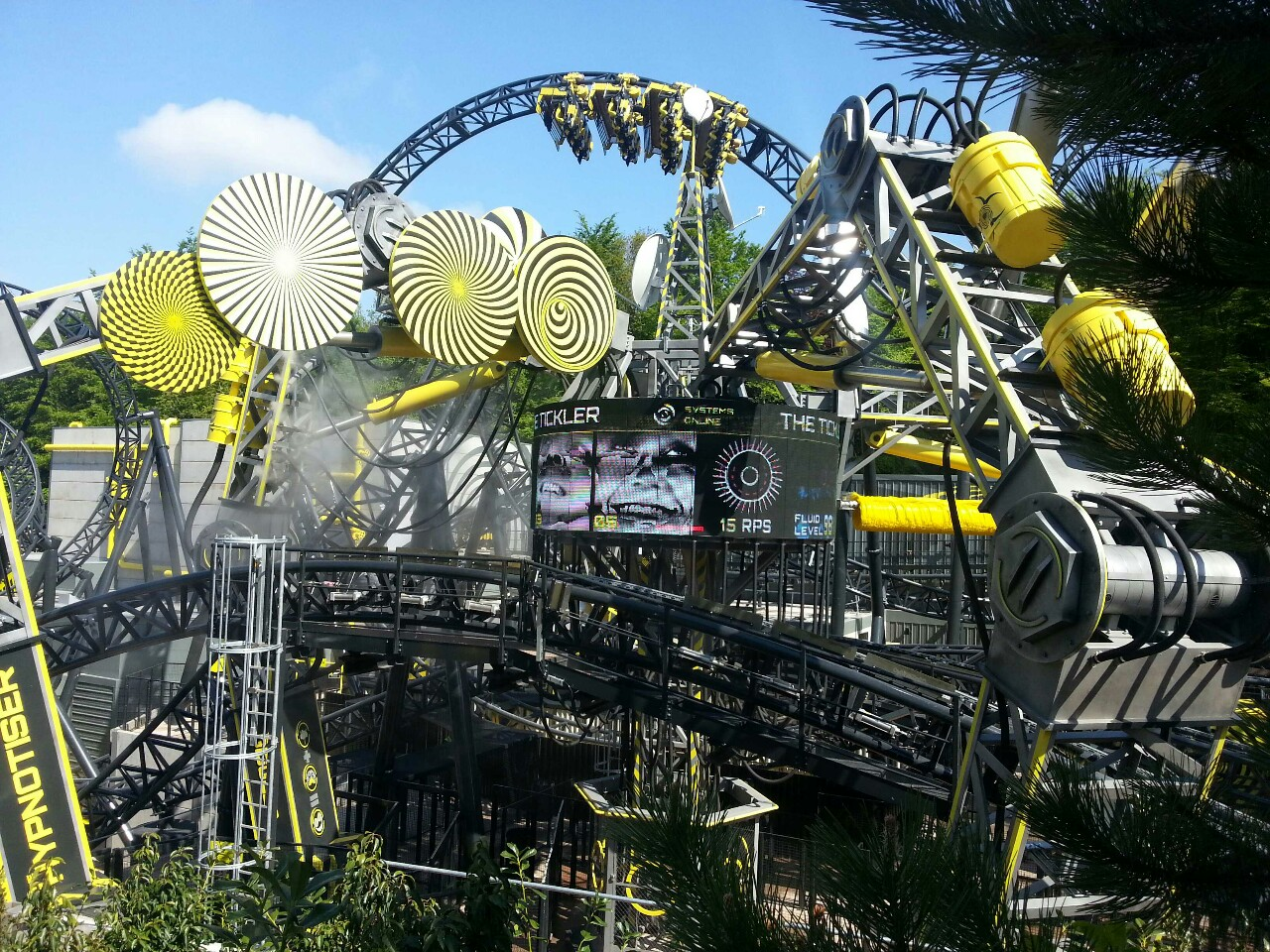
The Smiler, a Gerstlauer Infinity Coaster at Alton Towers, which holds the world record for the most inversions, at 14.

- Alpengeist at Busch Gardens Williamsburg, the world's tallest full-circuit inverted coaster
- Banshee at King's Island, the world's longest inverted coaster
- Batman: The Ride at Six Flags Great America, the first inverted roller coaster
- Corkscrew at Knott's Berry Farm, the world's first modern roller coaster to feature an inversion
- Eejanaika at Fuji-Q Highland, the world's tallest and second fastest wing coaster
- Falcon's Flight at Six Flags Qiddiya City, the world's tallest roller coaster at 535 feet (163 m), the world's fastest at 156 miles per hour (251 km/h), and longest at 13,944 feet (4,250 m)
- Formula Rossa at Ferrari World, the world's second fastest roller coaster at 150 mph (240 km/h)
- Kingda Ka at Six Flags Great Adventure, the former world's tallest roller coaster at 456 feet (139 m) and third fastest at 128 mph (206 km/h)
- Magnum XL-200, the first full-circuit roller coaster to exceed 200 feet (61 m)
- Matterhorn Bobsleds at Disneyland, the first tubular steel roller coaster
- Millennium Force at Cedar Point, the first full-circuit roller coaster to exceed 300 feet (91 m) in height
- Moonsault Scramble at Fuji-Q Highland, the first roller coaster over 200 feet (61 m) in height
- Ninja at Six Flags Magic Mountain, the world's fastest suspended roller coaster
- Olympia Looping, the world's tallest portable coaster at 106 feet (32 m), and the coaster with the most traditional vertical loops (5)
- Riddler's Revenge at Six Flags Magic Mountain, the world's tallest, fastest, and longest stand-up roller coaster
- Runaway Mine Train at Six Flags Over Texas, the first mine train roller coaster, built in 1966
- Steel Curtain at Kennywood- featuring the highest inversion in the world
- Steel Dragon 2000 at Nagashima Spa Land, the world's second longest roller coaster at 8,133 feet (2,479 m)
- Superman: Escape from Krypton at Six Flags Magic Mountain, the first roller coaster to exceed 400 feet (120 m) in height
- The Smiler at Alton Towers, the most inversions in the world (14)
- Takabisha at Fuji-Q Highland, formerly the world's steepest roller coaster with a beyond-vertical drop of 121° opened in 2011
- Tatsu at Six Flags Magic Mountain, the world's tallest and fastest flying roller coaster
- The New Revolution at Six Flags Magic Mountain, the first modern roller coaster with a vertical loop
- TMNT Shellraiser at Nickelodeon Universe, an indoor roller coaster with the steepest drop (121.5º) and the most inversions of any indoor coaster (7)
- Top Thrill 2 at Cedar Point, the world's first full-circuit roller coaster to exceed 400 feet (120 m) in height when it opened as Top Thrill Dragster
- Tormenta Rampaging Run, the tallest, longest and fastest dive coaster in the world
- Tower of Terror II at Dreamworld, the first roller coaster to reach 100 mph (160 km/h) in speed and 300 feet (91 m) in height
- Wonder Woman Golden Lasso Coaster at Six Flags Fiesta Texas, the world's first steel monorail roller coaster.
- X² at Six Flags Magic Mountain, the world's first 4th Dimension roller coaster
- Xcelerator at Knott's Berry Farm - world's first roller coaster to feature a hydraulic launch
