= Jim Kavourias =

American baseball player

- Outfielder
- Born: October 4, 1979 (age 45); Brooklyn, Ohio, U.S.
- Bats: Right Throws: Right

James S. Kavourias (born October 4, 1979 in Brooklyn, Ohio, United States) is a former professional baseball outfielder. Kavourias played in the Florida Marlins minor league system from 2000 to 2004. He participated in the 2004 Olympics, as a member of Greece's baseball team.
