= Kynes =

Kynes is a surname. Notable people with the surname include:

- James W. Kynes (1928–1988), American football player, lawyer, political appointee, and corporate executive
- Sandra Kynes, American author

== See also ==
- Liet-Kynes, a fictional character in the Dune franchise
- Kyne (surname)
