= Journal of Health Psychology =

- Discipline: Health psychology
- Language: English
- Edited by: Rachel Annunziato, Abigail Locke, Gareth Treharne

Publication details
- History: 1996–present
- Publisher: SAGE Publishing
- Frequency: 14/year
- Open access: Hybrid
- Impact factor: 3.2 (2022)

Standard abbreviations
- ISO 4: J. Health Psychol.

Indexing
- ISSN: 1359-1053 (print); 1461-7277 (web)
- LCCN: 96659556
- OCLC no.: 41385030

Links
- Journal homepage; Online access; Online archive

The Journal of Health Psychology is a peer-reviewed academic journal covering all aspects of health psychology. The editors-in-chief are Rachel Annunziato (Fordham University), Abigail Locke (Keele University), and Gareth Treharne (University of Otago). The founding editor-in-chief was David Marks, who served from 1996 to 2021. The journal publishes reports of empirical studies, critical reviews of the literature, contributions related to theory, open peer commentary articles, and editorials on what are deemed to be significant issues. It was established in 1996 and is published by SAGE Publishing.

== Special issue on the PACE trial ==
In July 2017, the journal published an entire issue devoted to the controversial PACE trial for ME/chronic fatigue syndrome. The articles were mostly critical of the PACE trial, and the journal concluded that "the results are, at best, unreliable, and at worst manipulated to produce a positive-looking outcome". However, three editorial board members of the journal, all of whom were alleged to have conflicts of interest, resigned in protest, claiming that the articles were biased and one-sided. In response, an associate editor of the journal, James C. Coyne, attacked the three resigning board members, calling one a "disgusting old fart neoliberal hypocrite", and telling another to "f*** off...you ol' sleazebag". Coyne left the editorial board as a consequence.

Following the publication of the PACE trial special issue, a debate was secured in the UK Parliament by Carol Monaghan, then MP for Glasgow North West, concerning the National Institute for Health and Care Excellence's (NICE) continued promotion of the PACE trial. Monaghan stated "from the very start the PACE trial was flawed," echoing the sentiment of Dr Keith Geraghty, the author of the journal article "'PACE-Gate': When clinical trial evidence meets open data access."

== Eysenck controversy content ==
In 2019, the journal published a review article by Anthony J. Pelosi that delivered a significant criticism of the work of the late Hans Jürgen Eysenck, referring to it as "one of the worst scientific scandals of all time" and calling for a "long-overdue formal investigation." Much of the work that was criticized found strong associations between certain personality types and cancer development. Pelosi’s article was backed up by an editorial by the then editor-in-chief of the journal, David Marks, that argued for a "correction of the scientific record." Following Pelosi's review and then an enquiry by the late psychologist's institution, King's College London, 26 of Eysenck's articles were concluded to be "unsafe." In a later interview with The Guardian newspaper, Pelosi stated that Eysenck "seemed to relish getting involved in controversial topics" and that once he had read Eysenck's arguments on personality and cancer he was "left with a firm impression that this was fraudulent." These revelations were made more significant given that on his death Eysenck was the third most cited psychologist of all time, behind Sigmund Freud and Jean Piaget.

== Abstracting and indexing ==
The journal is abstracted and indexed in:

- CINAHL
- Current Contents/Social & Behavioral Sciences
- EBSCO databases
- Embase
- Index Medicus/MEDLINE/PubMed
- PsycINFO
- Scopus
- Social Sciences Citation Index

According to the Journal Citation Reports, the journal has a 2022 impact factor of 3.2.

== See also ==
- Occupational health psychology
