= Memphis Kiddie Park =

Amusement park in Brooklyn, Ohio

- Interactive map of Memphis Kiddie Park
- Location: Brooklyn, Ohio, USA
- Coordinates: 41.440458°N 81.757336°W
- Opened: May 28, 1952

Attractions
- Total: 11
- Roller coasters: 1

Memphis Kiddie Park is a children's amusement park located in Brooklyn, Ohio. The park opened on May 28, 1952. It was one of several designed by Stuart Wintner, who also owned a chain of movie theaters. Wintner and his son Russell ran the park until each of their deaths.

The park is home to the Little Dipper roller coaster, one of the oldest operating steel roller coasters in North America.

== Current rides ==
There are 11 rides at Memphis Kiddie Park. All date back to the 1950s and have been maintained to keep their original appearances.

Name	Year opened	Type	Manufacturer	Height limit
Big Creek & Memphis Railway	1950s	Miniature train	Allan Herschell Company	No height limit
Boats	1950s	Spinning boat ride	Allan Herschell Company	Maximum 50 inches
Electric Roadway	1950s	Miniature race car ride	Unknown	Maximum 50 inches
Ferris Wheel	1950s	Miniature Ferris wheel	Unknown	Maximum 50 inches
Jeeps	1950s	Spinning car ride	Allan Herschell Company	Maximum 50 inches
Little Dipper	1952	Steel kiddie roller coaster	Allan Herschell Company	No height limit
Merry-Go-Round	1950s	Carousel	Allan Herschell Company	No height limit
MKP Airways	1950s	Spinning plane ride	Allan Herschell Company	Maximum 50 inches
Pony Carts	1950s	Miniature chariot track ride	Allan Herschell Company	Maximum 50 inches
Sky Fighters	1950s	Miniature spinning space ship ride	Allan Herschell Company	Maximum 50 inches
Turtle Chase	1950s	Miniature Tumble Bug ride	R. E. Chambers Company	Maximum 50 inches

In addition to the rides, the park also has a miniature golf course for both children and adults.
