= James Coyne =

James Coyne could refer to:

- James Henry Coyne (1849–1942), Canadian lawyer and historian
- James Bowes Coyne, Canadian lawyer and jurist, son of Henry
- James Elliott Coyne (1910–2012), Canadian Governor of the Bank of Canada, son of Bowes
- James K. Coyne III (born 1946), U.S. Representative from Pennsylvania
- James C. Coyne (1947–2024), American psychologist

== See also ==
- Jamie Coyne
