= Landzeal Group Ltd v Kyne =

- Court: High Court of New Zealand
- Full case name: Landzeal Group Limited v Simon Bernard Kyne (First Defendant) & Gary Moynan (Second Defendant)
- Decided: 16 March 1990
- Citation: [1990] 3 NZLR 574
- Transcript: High Court judgment

Court membership
- Judge sitting: Gallen J

Landzeal Group Ltd v Kyne [1990] 3 NZLR 574 is a cited case in New Zealand regarding the enforceability of employment restraint of trade contracts as well as the plea of non est factum.

== Background ==
Landzeal was a business that did vehicle graphics, and employed Simon Kyne and Gary Moynan. Kyne and Moynan later left Landzeal, and Landzeal filed for restraint of trade injunctions against both of them.

Kyne filed to have the interim injunction to be rescinded on the grounds that the restraint of trade clause that Landzeal produced to the court as evidence to support an injunction, Kyne claimed was not part of the original contract he signed. It turned out that Kyne was first given the original contract to sign, it was missing the page regarding the pay rates. Landzeal, then provided a new copy of the contract with the pay schedule, which Kyne then signed. However, this version of the contract also had added a restraint of trade clause.

Kyne pleaded that as this clause was secretly included in the revised second copy of the contract, that it was not legally enforceable under non est factum.

In Moynans case, whom had a restraint of trade clause in his contract, instead claimed the restraint of trade of 12 months was unreasonable.

== Held ==
The High Court ruled that Kyne's plea of non est factum was successful, making restraint of trade unenforceable.

Moynan however was not so lucky, with the court ruling a restraint of trade enforceable, although the time period was reduced to only 6 months.

Footnote: This case was subsequently followed in Chiswick Investments v Pevats [1990] 1 NZLR 169
