= Peter Coyne =

Peter Coyne may refer to:

- Peter Coyne (footballer) (born 1958), English footballer
- Peter Coyne (politician) (1917–2001), Australian politician
- Peter Coyne (rugby league) (born 1964), Australian rugby league player
