= Joseph Stirling Coyne =

British playwright

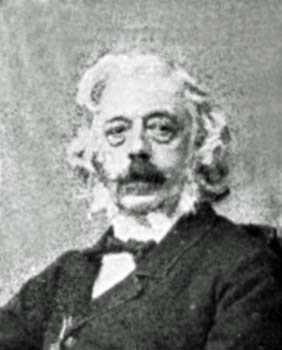
Portrait of Joseph Stirling Coyne

Joseph Stirling Coyne (1803–1868) was a humorist and satirist in the tradition of Jonathan Swift and Alexander Pope. One of the most prolific British playwrights of the mid-nineteenth century, he wrote more than sixty plays; his twenty-seven farces are surpassed in number only by John Maddison Morton's ninety-one and T. J. Williams's thirty. Coyne brought to the stage accomplished comedic interchanges, puns, irony, exaggerated character traits, ludicrous plot situations, and surprising outcomes. His plays reveal a deft ear for dialogue and an ability to create characters suited to the talents of specific actors. As a journalist Coyne contributed humorous pieces to many widely circulated journals and newspapers.

== Childhood ==
Coyne was born in 1803 to Denis Coyne, a port worker, and Bridget Coyne, née Cosgrave, in Birr, County Offaly, Ireland. After attending the Royal School Dungannon, he began studying law but decided to pursue a literary career after some of his articles appeared in local publications. His first farce, The Phrenologist, appeared at The Theatre Royal in Dublin in June 1835 and was revived two years later at what later became The Abbey Theatre.

== Remembrance ==
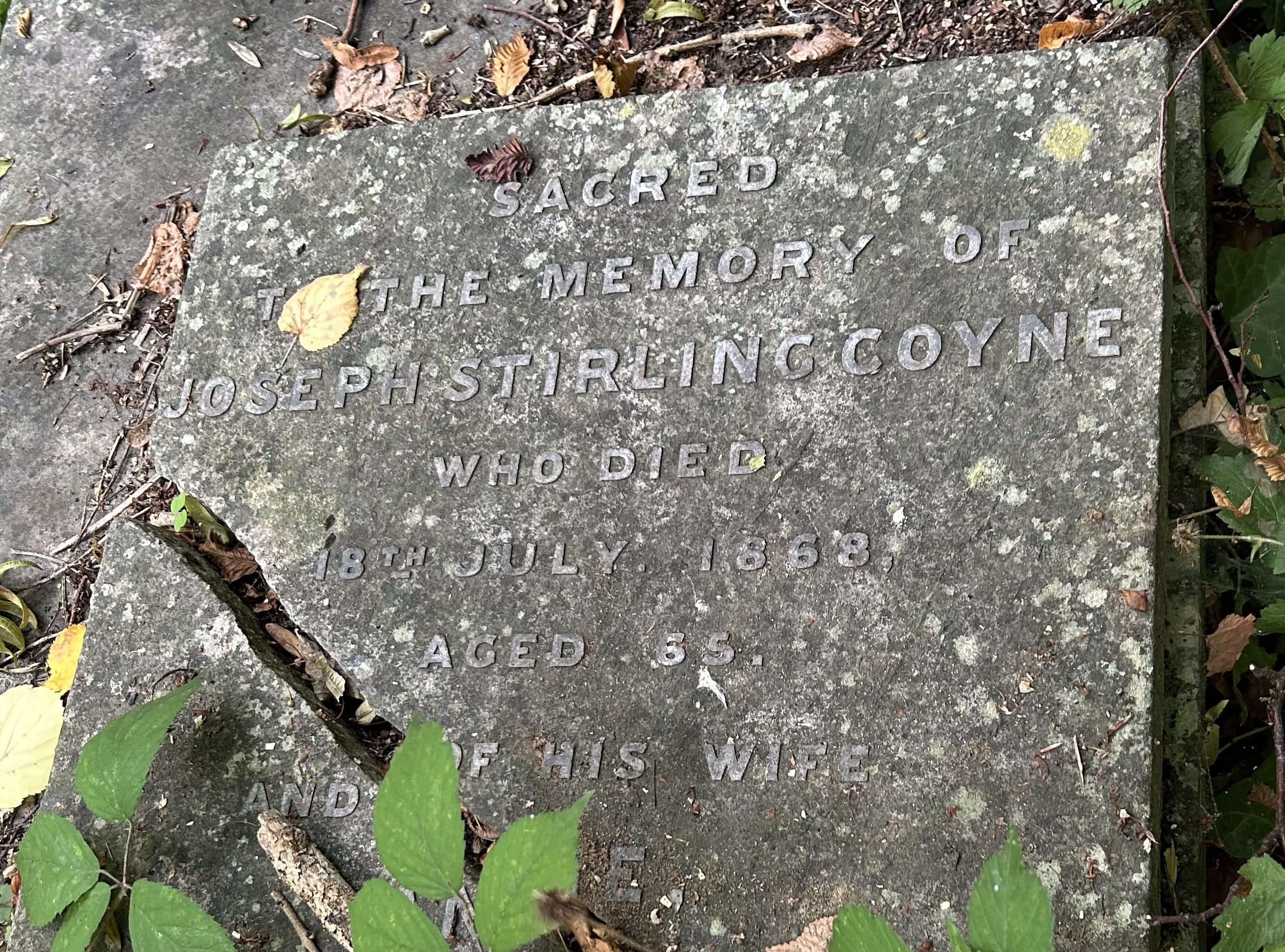
Grave of Joseph Coyne in Highgate Cemetery

Joseph Stirling Coyne's everyday characters and realistic situations and language appealed to working-class theatergoers, and his plays enjoyed long runs during the middle decades of the nineteenth century, when staged. Coyne is remembered for his humor and puns and for his satire of Victorian social and artistic conventions. His work is a significant link between the stylized French and English comedies of the eighteenth century and the witty, intellectual plays of Wilde and George Bernard Shaw.

Coyne died in 1868 and was buried on the western side of Highgate Cemetery. Irish-American writer Coyne Fletcher was his cousin.
