= Frank J. Coyne =

American businessman

- Born: 1948 (age 76–77); Scranton, Pennsylvania, U.S.
- Education: University of Scranton; Duquesne University (JD)
- Occupations: Businessman; lawyer

Frank J. Coyne (born 1948) is Chairman, former president, and former chief executive officer of Verisk Analytics and its subsidiary, Insurance Services Office (ISO).

== Biography ==
=== Personal life ===
Coyne received his bachelor's degree in political science as magna cum laude from the University of Scranton and his J.D. degree from Duquesne University. He also had a career in the United States Army, rising to the rank of captain.

=== Career ===
Coyne began his career in 1973 as a trial attorney with the U.S. Treasury Department. He joined Lynn Insurance Group in 1977 and served as vice president as well as assistant general counsel. In 1981, he joined Reliance Insurance Company and served as associate corporate general counsel and general counsel for the insurance business. He became vice president and general counsel of PMA Insurance Company in 1983.

Coyne joined General Accident Insurance Co. of America in 1985 as senior vice president and general counsel, with responsibility for legal, human resources, and administrative functions. Two years later, he became executive vice president - field operations, with responsibility for underwriting, claims, and marketing activities involving General Accident's 28 branch offices. In 1991, he was elected president and chief operating officer.

In February 1999 Coyne came to ISO as president and chief operating officer from Kemper Insurance Companies, where he served as executive vice president – specialty and risk management groups. On July 1, 2000, he was elected president and chief executive officer and became chairman two years later. During his career at ISO (later Verisk Analytics), Coyne led the company to grow revenue and profitability, culminating with a successful IPO in 2009.
