= Kiné Kirama Fall =

kiné Kirama Fall
- Born: 1934 (age 91–92); In the costal town of Rufisque near Dakar
- Citizenship: Senegalese
- Occupation: Poet
- Known for: Mystical quality which express love of nature and God
- Notable work: Chants de la rivière fraîche and Les élans de grâce

Kiné Kirama Fall (Note: Her name has sometimes been spelled Kine Kirima Fall.) is the pseudonym of a Senegalese poet (born 1934) who published two volumes of her French-language verse in the 1970s, when there were not many women writers in Senegal. She is known for the mystical quality of her poems, which express a love of nature and of God.

== Biography ==
She was born in 1934 in the coastal town of Rufisque near Dakar. She had no high school education and came late to literacy in French. This may have freed her from European conventions and contributed a Senegalese authenticity to her work, according to poet-politician Leopold Senghor. Fall felt honoured by the support she had from President Senghor, who wrote an introduction to her first book of poetry. After reading her poems and meeting her, the poet Birago Diop took an interest in her work and gave her encouragement. In the early 1970s Fall was working in news.

In 1973 she told an interviewer that her poetry was nearly always song: singing of the earth, the sea, the sky, but above all of God. Her themes chose her, she said: themes mainly of "nature, God and human experience". Senghor thought her work showed a "typically African combination of spirituality and sensuality". Another critic mentions the "freshness, economy, and spirituality" she brings to writing about love, torment, faith and nature.

She was one of an early generation of women writers in Senegal who emerged in the years after independence in 1960 but remained for some time almost unknown internationally. Fall said she was singing for all the girls and women of Africa. Her poems have echoes of regional traditions of orality, most obviously in praise songs, and echoes too of her native Wolof language.

== Works ==
- Chants de la rivière fraîche: poèmes. Dakar: Nouvelles Éditions Africaines, 1975
- Les élans de grâce. Yaoundé: Editions CLE, 1979
