= Coyne Fletcher =

American writer

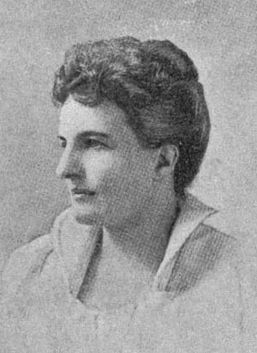
- Coyne Fletcher, from an 1895 publication
- Born: Lydia Coyne Fletcher about 1853; Dublin, Ireland
- Died: March 2, 1904; Washington, D.C.
- Occupation: Writer
- Relatives: Joseph Stirling Coyne (cousin)

Lydia Coyne Fletcher (about 1853 – March 2, 1904) was an Irish-American playwright and novelist.

== Early life and education ==
Fletcher was born in Dublin, Ireland and raised in Baltimore, Maryland. Her uncle Charles Leonard Fletcher was a playwright in New York City, and ran an acting school there. "Coyne" was her grandmother's family name; dramatist Joseph Stirling Coyne was her cousin.

== Career ==
Fletcher was a governess as a young woman. She was a postal clerk in Washington, D.C., and wrote novels and plays. She was a charter member of the Association of American Authors when it was founded in 1892. She adapted her military comedy A Bachelor's Baby for the stage, and it was produced in Tennessee and Washington in 1895, and on Broadway in 1897. Olga Nethersole was cast to star in her play Yvolna (1898), based on Salammbo by Flaubert.

Beyond fiction and plays, Fletcher's 1891 essay on the South Carolina lowlands is still cited as a useful first-hand account of the region a generation after the American Civil War. She went to court in 1902 concerning 32 acres of land in Washington, known as "Girl's Portion".

== Works ==
- The Moonshiners (1880)
- Brother Shadrack (1882)
- Glenflesk (1882)
- Outlawed (1882)
- Madge (1882)
- The Indians (1882, with Arthur McKee Rankin)
- The Americans (1883, with Arthur McKee Rankin)
- Me and Chummy (1890)
- A Bachelor's Baby (1886, 1891)
- "In the Lowlands of South Carolina" (1891, Frank Leslie's Popular Monthly)
- Who Am I? (1897)
- Yvolna (1898)
- An American Alliance (1899)
- Sans Culotte (1900)
- The Cardinal's Love Story (1901)
- A Cavalier of Maryland (1901)
- His Other Self (1903)
- An Irish Nobleman (1903)
- Mirabeau (1903)
- The Silence of the Judge (1903)

== Personal life and legacy ==
Fletcher was described as a "tall, handsome woman", a "strong character" and a "bachelor woman", with a knack for decorating and entertaining. She collected steel engravings and souvenir cushions. "As a dialect storyteller, she has no equal among any women I have known," wrote one reporter in 1894.

Fletcher died in 1904, at the age of 50, in a hospital in Washington, D.C. In 1909, a play named A Bachelor's Baby was produced by Charles Frohman in New York, without credit to Fletcher; her nephew sued to stop the production. The credited playwright, Francis Wilson, claimed that the works only shared a title. Three films were produced with essentially the same title: A Bachelor's Baby (1922), The Bachelor's Baby (1927) and Bachelor's Baby (1932); but none of them credited Fletcher's novel or play as source material.
