= Sandra Kynes =

American author

Sandra Kynes is an American author who has written several books based on her pagan beliefs. Her works include A Year of Ritual, Gemstone Feng Shui, Whispers from the Woods, Sea Magic, Change at Hand and Your Altar.

Kynes' works have been translated into Spanish, Portuguese, Czech, and Russian.

== Reception ==
The Wiccan/Pagan Times writes that A Year of Ritual presents "a basic handbook of very generic rituals focusing on individuals and covens", describing rituals for The Sabbats and The Esbats; the information is "easy to understand" and the rituals are "ready to go", to the extent that "the experienced practitioner will become bored quickly with the material".

== Select bibliography ==
- 2002 Gemstone Feng Shui: Creating harmony in home & office ISBN 0-7387-0219-6 (Llewellyn Worldwide)
- 2004 A Year of Ritual: Sabbats & Esbats for Solitaries & Covens ISBN 0-7387-0583-7 (Llewellyn Worldwide)
- 2006 Whispers from the woods: the lore & magic of trees ISBN 0-7387-0781-3 (Llewellyn Worldwide)
- 2007 Your Altar: Creating a Sacred Space for Prayer and Meditation ISBN 0-7387-1105-5 (Llewellyn Worldwide)
- 2008 Sea Magic: Connecting with the Ocean's Energy ISBN 0-7387-1353-8 (Llewellyn Worldwide)
- 2009 Change at Hand: Balancing Your Energy Through Palmistry, Chakras & Mudras ISBN 0-7387-1570-0 (Llewellyn Worldwide)
- 2013 Llewellyn's Complete Book of Correspondences ISBN 9780738732534 (Llewellyn Worldwide)
