= Chiswick Investments v Pevats =

New Zealand legal case

- Court: High Court of New Zealand
- Full case name: Chiswick Investments v Mark John Pevats
- Decided: 2 August 1989
- Citation: [1990] 1 NZLR 169
- Transcript: High Court judgment

Court membership
- Judge sitting: Gallen J

Chiswick Investments v Pevats [1990] 1 NZLR 169 is a cited New Zealand case regarding mistake.

== Background ==
Pevats, an external accountant, was the company secretary and nominal shareholder (1 share) in a company called Topp Engineering Limited. One day, the director of the company, Mr Allan Hebdon visited his firms accountancy firm, asking him to witness a loan agreement between the company and the Development Finance Corporation.

Pevats applied the company seal and signed as a witness of the seal.

At this stage, Pevats informed Hebdon, that he was signing merely as a witness, and in no way was he agreeing to give a personal guarantee for the loan. Pevat also signed in the shareholder section.

It was later discovered there was a personal guarantee in the loan contract, which was rather unfortunate for Pevast, as the company defaulted on the loan, and Chiswick Investments, whom had been assigned the loan from the DFC, sued Pevat personally for repayment of the loan under the shareholder guarantee.

Pevats pleaded mistake and non est factum.

== Held ==
In a seemingly conflicting ruling, the Court ruled that there was no unilateral mistake here, so the personal guarantee was deemed legally enforceable against Pevats. However, it held that Pevats was not negligent in signing the loan agreement, as he innocently thought he was merely witnessing the company seal, making his plea of Non Est Factum successful here.
