= Kyne (surname) =

Kyne is a surname of Irish origin, a variant of Coyne. Notable people with the surname include:

- Jamie Kyne, Irish jockey
- Jeremy Kyne, Canadian rugby union player
- John Anthony Kyne, Irish Catholic bishop
- Peter B. Kyne, American novelist
- Phonse Kyne, Australian rules footballer
- Seán Kyne, Irish Fine Gael politician (TD for Galway West)
- Thomas Kyne, Irish Labour politician (TD for Waterford 1948–1969) and trade union official

== See also ==
- Kynes, another surname
