= James C. Coyne =

American psychologist

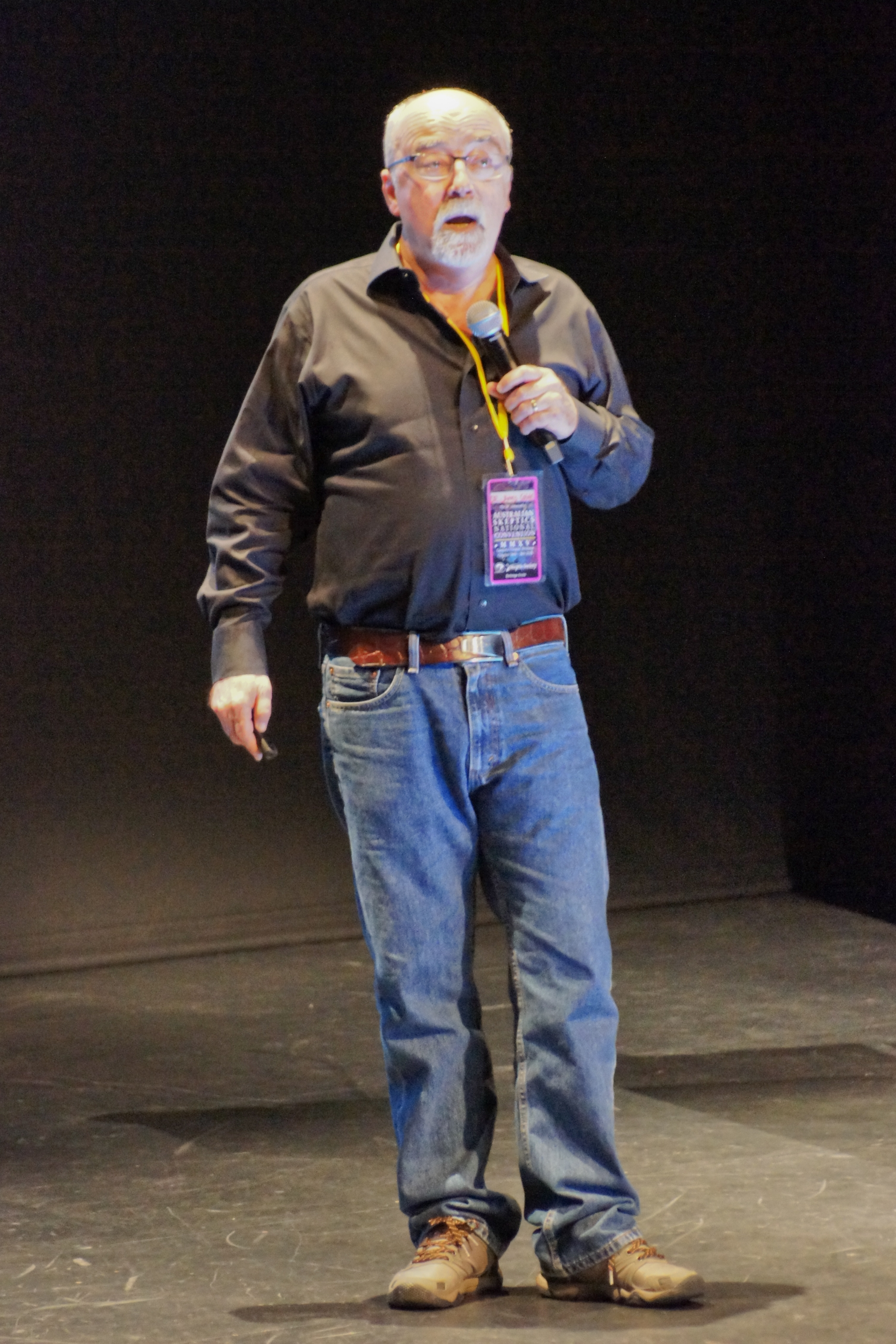
Coyne in 2015

James C. Coyne (22 October 1947 – 10 November 2024) was an American psychologist.

== Education and career ==
Born in Chelsea, Massachusetts, Coyne attended New London High School in New London, Connecticut. He received his B.A. (1968) from Carnegie-Mellon University and his Ph.D. in psychology (1975) from Indiana University Bloomington (dissertation title Depression and the Response of Others). After being a Clinical Psychology Intern at the University of Florida in 1972–1973, he was an instructor at Miami University from 1973 to 1975, where he became an assistant professor in 1975. He became professor at the Perelman School of Medicine at the University of Pennsylvania in 1999, and became an emeritus professor there upon his retirement in 2013.

Coyne was named an ISI Highly Cited Researcher by Clarivate Analytics in 2001, and was ranked #200 in a 2014 list of the most eminent psychologists of the post-World War II era.

== Research ==
Coyne's research from the 1980s suggested that negative responses by others to depressive behavior can increase the social isolation of depressed individuals, potentially leading to a "depressive spiral".

A 2007 study led by Coyne found that positive emotional well-being was not associated with increased life expectancy among head and neck cancer patients.

== Views ==
Coyne has criticized the field of positive psychology and the research claiming that a positive attitude can impact one's health. He has also criticized studies which have concluded that personality traits are linked to an increased risk of cancer death.

Coyne has stated that a 1970s study by Ellen Langer, which found that elderly people given plants to take care of lived longer than those who were not, would not have "much credibility today, nor would it meet the tightened standards of rigor."

Coyne has also criticized studies that claimed to have shown that acceptance and commitment therapy was effective in reducing rehospitalization in cases of psychosis. In his article "Troubles in the Branding of Psychotherapies as "Evidence Supported'", Coyne stated:

On September 3, 2012 the APA Division 12 website announced a rating of "strong evidence" for the efficacy of acceptance and commitment therapy for psychosis. I was quite skeptical. I posted links on Facebook and Twitter to a series of blog posts (1, 2, 3) in which I had previously debunked the study claiming to demonstrate that a few sessions of ACT significantly reduced rehospitalization of psychotic patients.

David Klonsky, a friend on FB who maintains the Division 12 treatment website quickly contacted me and indicated that he would reevaluate the listing after reading my blog posts and that he had already contacted the section editor to get her evaluation. Within a day, the labeling was changed to "designation under re-review as of 9/3/12" and it is now (10/16/12) "modest research support."

— James C. Coyne

In 2015, Coyne criticized Gabriele Oettingen's book Rethinking Positive Thinking and accused Oettingen of aggressively promoting pseudoscience while ignoring other research in clinical psychology. Coyne pointed out that as part of Oettingen's aggressive promotional campaign for her book, her own son created Wikipedia articles about her work.

In 2017, Coyne vituperated his co-editors at the Journal of Health Psychology, including George Davey Smith. The disagreements were over the special issue on the PACE trial for myalgic encephalomyelitis/chronic fatigue syndrome, which three of his co-editors considered to be too one-sided.
