= John M. Coyne =

American politician

Mayor of Brooklyn, Ohio
- In office 1948–1999

Treasurer of Brooklyn, Ohio
- In office 1944–1946

Personal details
- Born: November 11, 1916 Brooklyn, Ohio, U.S.
- Died: July 21, 2014 (aged 97) Brooklyn, Ohio, U.S.
- Party: Democratic Party
- Spouse: Ruth Coyne (deceased)

John M. Coyne Sr. (November 11, 1916 – July 21, 2014) was the mayor of Brooklyn, Ohio from 1948 to 1999. Coyne held the record for the longest consecutive term of any mayor in United States at the time he left office. Coyne continued to reside in the city. He was reportedly responsible for the country's first seat belt (in 1966) and mobile phone laws for motorists, bringing notoriety to Brooklyn. In Brooklyn, police stopped 150 cars the first six months of the ordinance, letting drivers off with warnings. After that, minimal fines were imposed, with Coyne quoted as saying, "...because the worst thing you can do is give the impression that you're socking them for taxation."

Coyne died in Brooklyn, Ohio from natural causes, aged 97.

== Awards and Distinctions ==
His awards include:

- Doctor of Humane Letters
- John M. and Ruth Jean Coyne-Endowed Public Service Scholarship (1997)
- Maxine Goodman Levin College of Urban Affairs, Cleveland State University,
- Honorary Director and Player of the Year (1995),
- USA Toy Library Association,
- Party Chairman, Cuyahoga County Democratic Party (1982–93), 13th Largest County in the U.S; Five Consecutive Terms.
- Board Member (1990–91), Cuyahoga County Board of Elections,
- Hall of Fame Inductee (1987), Brooklyn High School,
- Board Member (1972–87), Deacones Hospital Board of Trustees.
- Ohio Supreme Court, Citizens Member of Rules Advisory Committee (1982–85), Appointed by Chief Justice Frank D. Celebrezze,
- Irish Good Fellowship Club Award (1984),
- Man of the Year (1983), Waterford Society,
- Regional Transit Authority (1981–82), Suburban Representative for Greater Cleveland on Board of Trustees.
- First Recipient of the Ernest J. Bohn Award (1997),
- N.E. Ohio Chapter of the American Society for Public Administration for Outstanding Execution of Public Business.
- President (1959–60), Cuyahoga County Mayors and City Managers Association.

== Other Achievements ==
Coyne pioneered legislation positioning Brooklyn, Ohio as the vanguard of public safety initiatives: the 1998 cell phone law restricted use of hand-held cell phones while driving. His 1989 Assault Weapons Ban and Mandatory Waiting Period laws prohibited the possession of certain assault weapons and mandated a ten-day waiting period for gun sale transactions.

== Legacy ==
Coyne has a recreation center in his name, the "John M. Coyne Recreation Center," located in Brooklyn, Ohio.

== See also ==
- List of longest-serving United States mayors
