= John N. Coyne =

John Nicholas Coyne Jr.
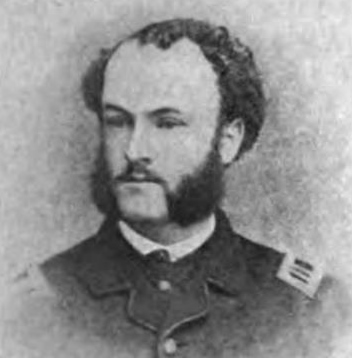
- John N. Coyne, c. 1907
- Born: November 14, 1839; New York, New York
- Died: March 4, 1907 (aged 67); Orange, New Jersey
- Burial place: Green-Wood Cemetery, Brooklyn, New York
- Military career
- Allegiance: United States of America
- Branch: United States Army (Union Army)
- Rank: Lieutenant colonel
- Units: (New York (state)) 7th New York Militia Regiment (Company G: private) (New York (state)) 70th New York Volunteer Infantry Regiment (Company B: sergeant, Company F: first lieutenant: Company D: captain)
- Conflicts: American Civil War: Siege of Yorktown; Battle of Williamsburg; Battle of Seven Pines/Fair Oaks; Battle of Fredericksburg; Chancellorsville Campaign/Battle of Chancellorsville; Gettysburg Campaign/Battle of Gettysburg; Battle of Wapping Heights; Mine Run Campaign; Overland Campaign; Battle of the Wilderness; Battle of Spotsylvania Court House; Battle of North Anna; Battle of Totopotomoy Creek; Battle of Cold Harbor; Siege of Petersburg
- Awards: Medal of Honor

John Nicholas Coyne Jr. (November 14, 1839 to March 4, 1907) was a United States military officer who fought with the Union Army as a member of the 70th New York Infantry during the American Civil War. He received his nation's highest award for valor, the U.S. Medal of Honor, for capturing an enemy flag while engaged in hand-to-hand combat during the Battle of Williamsburg in Virginia on May 5, 1862. That flag was "[t]he first Confederate flag captured on the battle-field" by the Union Army during the war, according to historian Thomas S. Townsend. Coyne's medal was conferred on April 18, 1888.

== Formative years ==
Born in New York City, New York on November 14, 1839, John Nicholas Coyne Jr. was a son of John Nicholas Coyne Sr. (1815–1854), a native of Ireland, and New York City native Hannah Anne (Parke) Avery (1804–1888), whose first husband, Samuel Putnam Avery (1797-1832), had died in 1832. Initially reared in New York City with his brother, Charles Russell Coyne (1845–1899), and their half-siblings, Samuel P. (1822–1904), Hannah S.(1824–1885) and Susan Jane Avery (b. 1826), his life and that of his siblings changed with the death of their father on May 31, 1854. Sometime after John Coyne Sr.'s burial at the Green-Wood Cemetery in Brooklyn, John N. Coyne Jr. relocated with his mother and brother to Jersey City, New Jersey. By 1860, John Coyne was employed as an editor and residing with his mother, Hannah, and her third husband, John Owen Rouse (1818-1896), in Jersey City.

John Coyne Jr. then began his own family when he married Sallie Johnson Matthews sometime around 1862. Their daughter, Sadie Matthews Coyne was born in Pennsylvania on December 22, 1863.

== Civil War ==
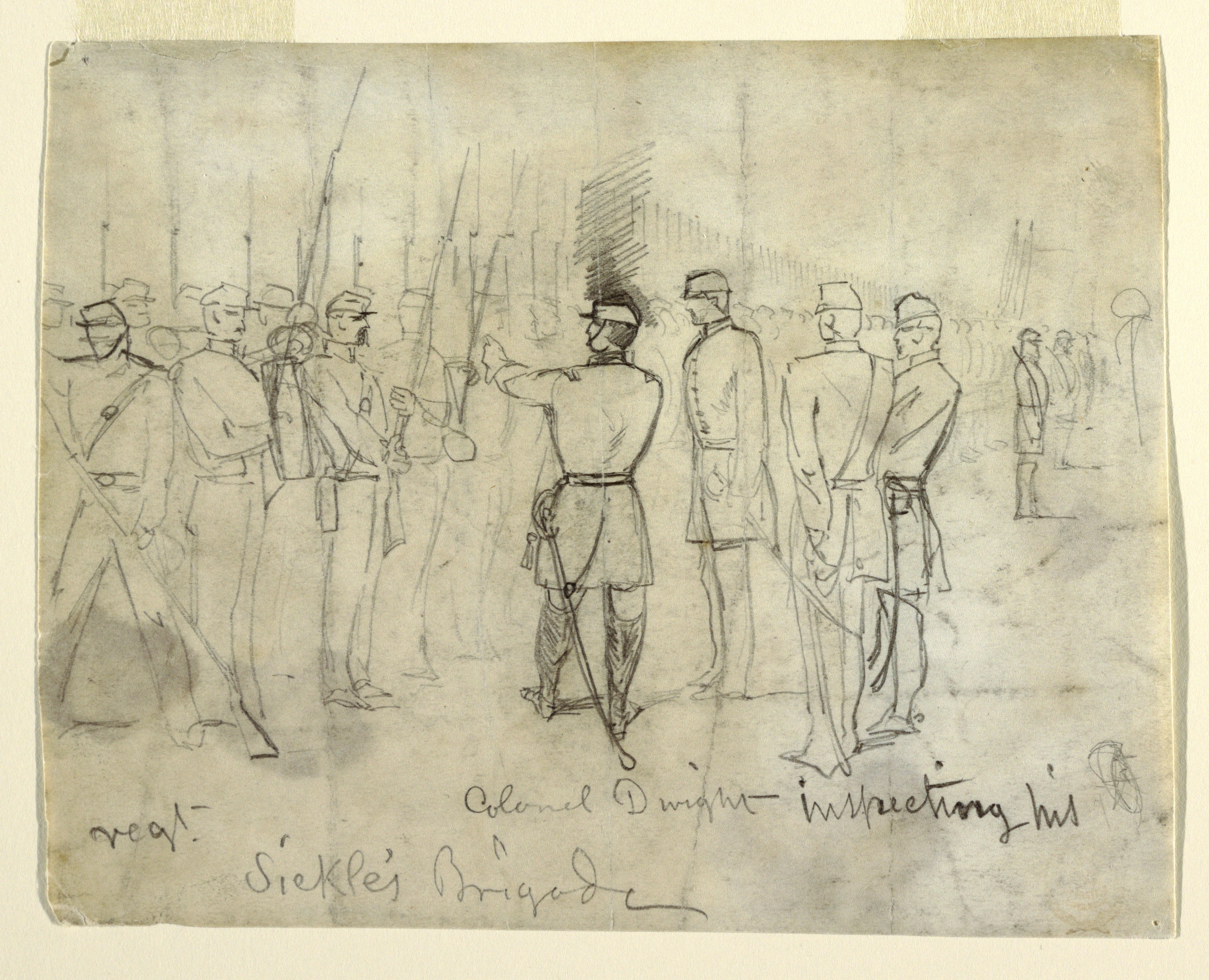
Col. William Dwight Jr. inspects the 70th New York Infantry in 1862.

John N. Coyne became one of his nation's earliest responders to President Abraham Lincoln's call for volunteers to help defend Washington, D.C. following the fall of Fort Sumter on April 13, 1861. Enrolling for Civil War military service, he mustered in on April 26 as a private with Company G of the 7th New York Militia. After honorably completing his Three Months' Service, he mustered out with his unit on June 3. Just over six months later, at the age of 22, he signed up for a three-year tour of duty in New York City, mustering in on January 20, 1862 with Company B of the 70th New York Infantry, which was part of the "Excelsior Brigade" and the U.S. Army of the Potomac. On January 28, he was advanced to the rank of sergeant. Serving initially as part of the brigade led by Brigadier-General Daniel Sickles, which was part of the division commanded by Brigadier-General Joseph Hooker, he and his regiment were reassigned to the 2nd Brigade, 2nd Division of the U.S. Army's III Corps in March, and ordered to duties associated with the Siege of Yorktown. On May 7, he was commissioned as a second lieutenant, and assigned to the command staff of his regiment's F Company.

During the spring of 1862, Coyne performed the act of valor for which he would later be awarded the U.S. Medal of Honor. According to Medal of Honor historians W. F. Beyer and O. F. Keydel:

When the enemy were overtaken at Williamsburg [on May 5, 1862] the Third Excelsior, of the Seventieth New York Volunteers, was in advance. It was a dark, rainy morning. A heavy vapor covered the field, and the smoke of the battle obscured the scene. As the supporting regiment approached, the enemy, who were concealed in the thick woods, sent up the cry: 'Show us your colors!' The color-bearer waved the flag, and, as its folds spread out and showed the stars and stripes, the rebels advanced from the woods and opened fire. The fire was returned so effectively that they were driven back. Another advance, with re-enforcements, was also repulsed by the valiant Excelsiors.

After several hours of conflict the ammunition became exhausted, and the New Yorkers were ordered to fall back by companies. Sergeant Coyne's company, which during the latter part of the battle was under his command, the captain and lieutenant having been disabled, became separated, and a number of them, missing their way, found themselves with their leader confronted by a party of the enemy surrounding their color-bearer....

Coyne singled out the color-bearer and rushed upon him. The rebel was too strong to be conquered by such an assault, and defended his flag bravely until a bullet, shattering his right hand, forced him to loosen his hold and enabled Coyne to drag the trophy from him. Tearing the flag from the staff and tying it around his body, he turned to offer battle to any one who should attempt to retake it; but survivors of the enemy were hurriedly leaving the field before a rescuing party sent by General Heintzelman. Of the brave band who had supported their leader but few remained standing, and Sergeant Cook, Corporal Beekman, and Privates Howard and Lynch were killed outright.

Sergeant Coyne received the commission of second lieutenant to date from the battle. He was mentioned for bravery in general orders by General Heintzelman, and was advanced to the rank of lieutenant-colonel for several acts of gallantry during the war.

The flag captured by Coyne was reportedly the first Confederate States Army flag to be taken by a Union Army soldier on an American Civil War battlefield, according to historian Thomas S. Townsend.

Coyne was then wounded in action on June 1, 1862 while fighting with his regiment during the Battle of Seven Pines (also known as the Battle of Fair Oaks). After recuperating, he returned to duty, and fought with his regiment in the Battle of Fredericksburg (December 11–15). Three days after Christmas in 1862, Coyne was advanced in rank again, having been recommissioned as a first lieutenant. After emerging from winter quarters, Coyne and his regiment were assigned, once again, to the 2nd Brigade, 2nd Division, III Corps in the Army of the Potomac. During the spring and summer of that year, they then fought in the Battle of Chancellorsville as part of the Chancellorsville Campaign (April 30 – May 6).

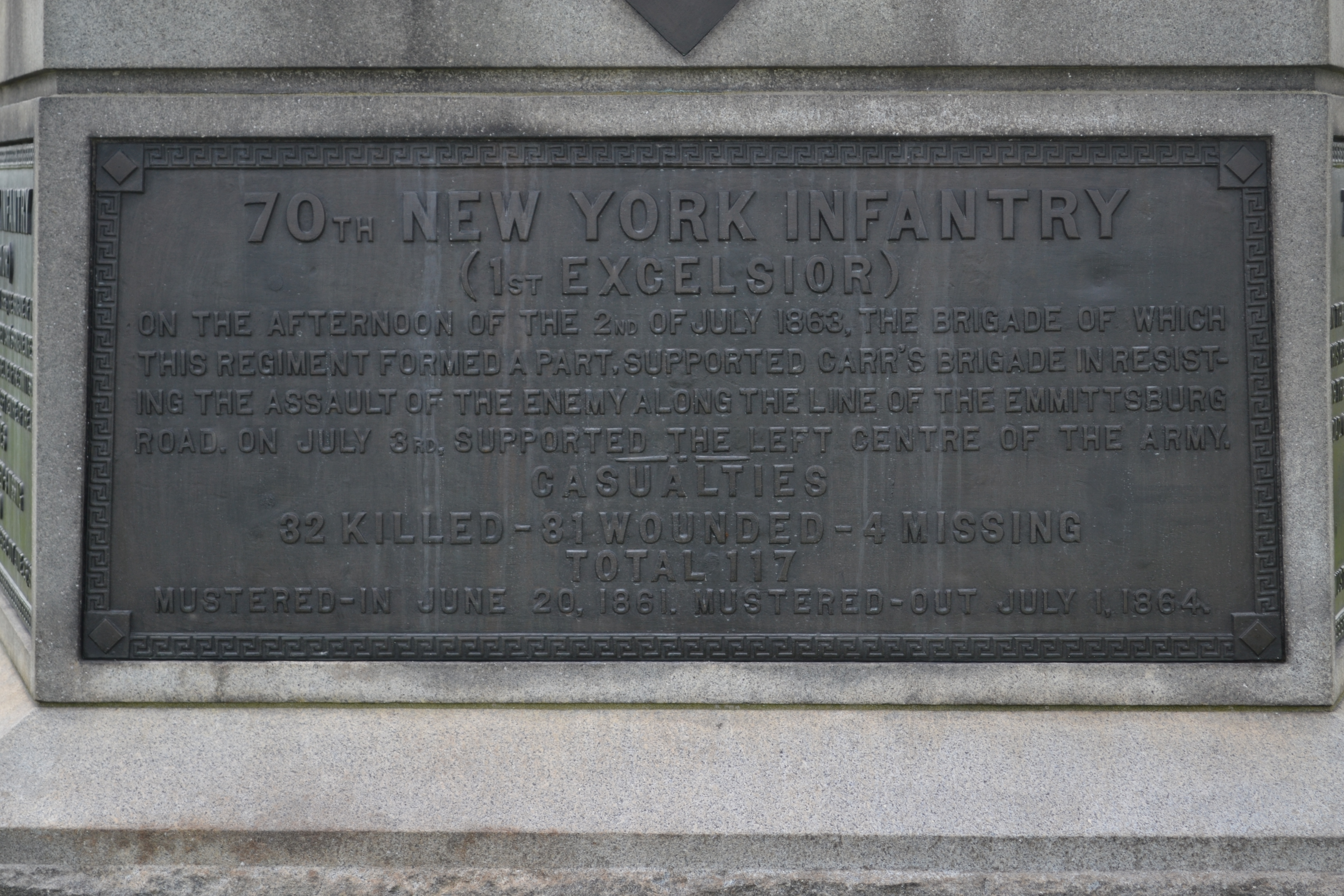
Plaque, 70th New York Infantry monument, Gettysburg National Battlefield, Pennsylvania.

While fighting with his regiment in the Battle of Gettysburg as part of the Gettysburg Campaign (June 3 – July 24), Coyne was wounded in action again, this time on July 2, 1863. Three weeks later, he was commissioned as a captain, and placed in charge of the 70th New York Infantry's D Company. On July 23, he led his new company in combat with other Union troops in the Battle of Wapping Heights (also known as the Battle of Manassas Gap) and in the Mine Run Campaign (November 27 – December 2.

After emerging from winter quarters during the early spring of 1864, Coyne and his regiment were reassigned to the 2nd Brigade, 4th Division of the U.S. Army's II Corps from March to May and then re-assigned again in May to the 4th Brigade, 3rd Division within that same Corps. Ordered to duties associated with Lieutenant-General Ulysses S. Grant's Overland Campaign (May 4 – June 24, 1864), they then fought in the battles of the Wilderness (May 5–7), Spotsylvania Court House (May 8–21), North Anna (May 23–26), Totopotomoy Creek (May 28–30), and Cold Harbor (May 31 – June 12), and engaged in the Siege of Petersburg from June 9 until June 22 when the regiment was transported back to New York for muster out and reorganization. Although a number of 70th New York infantrymen were subsequently re-mustered into the 86th New York Infantry, Coyne was honorably mustered out in New York City on July 1, 1864.

== Post-war life ==
Following his honorable discharge from the military, Coyne returned to New Jersey, where he found work as a customs house clerk in Jersey City and resumed life with his wife, Sallie, and their daughter, Saidee. Another daughter, Mary, was then born in June 1870.

During the 1880s and 1890s, he was active with the Mutual Aid Society of the Jersey City and Bergen Railroad Company. In 1893, he attended the fourth annual convention of the Medal of Honor Legion, which was held at the Holland House in New York City in October. By the fall of 1900, he had advanced professionally to become chief clerk of the disbursing department of the Customs House.

Coyne died from disease-related complications in Orange, New Jersey on March 4, 1907, and was interred at the Green-Wood Cemetery in Brooklyn, New York on March 7. His funeral announcement noted that he was a member of the Military Order, Loyal Legion, United States (Commandery State of New York).

== Medal of Honor citation ==
Rank and organization: Sergeant, Company B, 70th New York Infantry. Place and date: At Williamsburg, Va., May 5, 1862. Entered service at: New York, N.Y. Date of Issue: April 18, 1888:

The President of the United States of America, in the name of Congress, takes pleasure in presenting the Medal of Honor to Sergeant John Nicholas Coyne, United States Army, for extraordinary heroism on May 5, 1862, while serving with Company B, 70th New York Infantry, in action at Williamsburg, Virginia, for capture of a flag after a severe hand-to-hand contest; was mentioned in orders for his gallantry.

== See also ==
- List of American Civil War Medal of Honor recipients: A–F
- New Jersey in the 19th century
- New Jersey in the American Civil War
- New York in the American Civil War
