= Brooklyn, Ohio =

- City
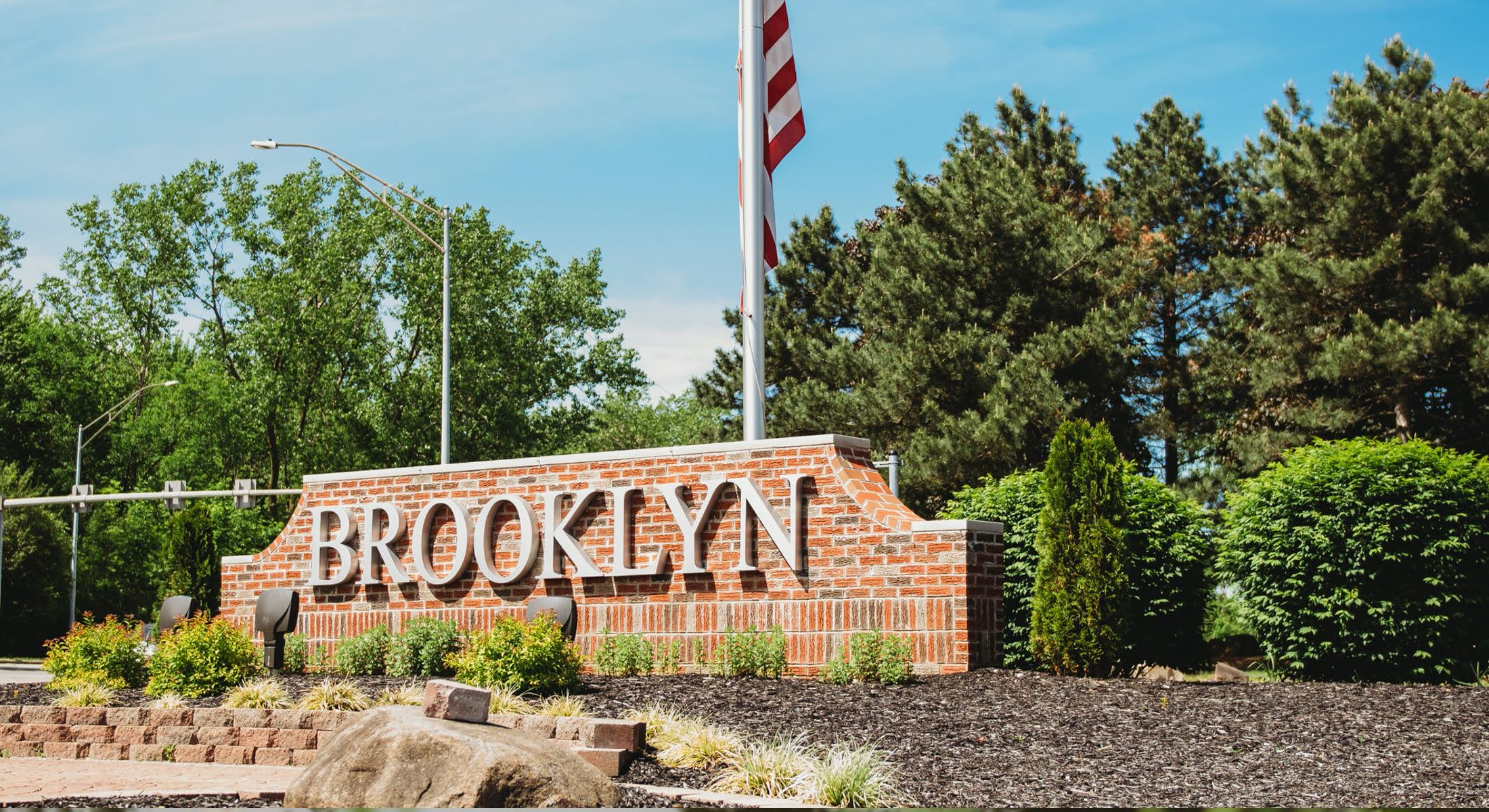
- Welcome sign at Biddulph Avenue & Tiedeman Road

- Seal Logo
- Interactive map of Brooklyn, Ohio
- Location within Ohio Location within the United States
- Coordinates: 41°26′7″N 81°44′40″W
- Country: United States
- State: Ohio
- County: Cuyahoga

Government
  - Mayor: Ron Van Kirk (R)

Area
  - Total: 4.28 sq mi (11.09 km^{2})
  - Land: 4.25 sq mi (11.01 km^{2})
  - Water: 0.031 sq mi (0.08 km^{2})
- Elevation: 764 ft (233 m)

Population (2020)
  - Total: 11,359
  - Estimate (2023): 11,022
  - Density: 2,672.0/sq mi (1,031.65/km^{2})
- Time zone: UTC-5 (Eastern (EST))
  - Summer (DST): UTC-4 (EDT)
- ZIP code: 44144
- Area code: 216
- FIPS code: 39-09246
- GNIS feature ID: 1056727
- Website: www.brooklynohio.gov

Brooklyn is a city in Cuyahoga County, Ohio, United States. Its population was 11,359 at the 2020 census. A suburb of Cleveland, it is a part of the Cleveland metropolitan area.

== History ==
Brooklyn was home to the first seat belt law in 1966 and the first cell phone law for motorists in 1999.

The Hugo Boss plant was closed for three months in 2009 and was going to ship the jobs overseas to Turkey, but the union and the City of Brooklyn were able to reach a compromise and a three-year contract to reopen the plant shortly after.

=== Brooklyn High School concert ===
Brooklyn High School gained attention on October 20, 1955, when Elvis Presley performed in its auditorium. It was the first concert Presley performed in the northern United States and is also believed to be the first filmed concert in his career. Nearly a year later, he appeared on The Ed Sullivan Show for the first time. Presley was not the headliner at the concert organized by Cleveland DJ Bill Randle. The other, more popular performers were Bill Haley & His Comets, the Four Lads, and Pat Boone.

On October 20, 2005, some of the acts returned to participate in an anniversary event for this visit. Among the acts were Priscilla Wright and Bill Haley's Original Comets. The BHS Chorale also performed a song with Priscilla Wright. "Rock and Roll Hall of Fame and Museum designates Brooklyn High School a national rock 'n' roll landmark; Elvis Presley performed at the school on Oct 20, 1955".

== Geography ==
Brooklyn is located at 41°26′7″N 81°44′40″W (41.435357, -81.744457).

According to the United States Census Bureau, the city has a total area of 4.29 square miles (11.11 km^{2}), of which 0.04 square miles (0.10 km^{2}) is covered by water.

== Demographics ==
As their first language, 86.2% of the population spoke English, 2.8% Spanish, 2.5% Arabic, 2.0% Italian, 1.7% German, and 1.4% Greek.

Historical population
Census	Pop.	Note	%±
1870	648		—
1930	784		—
1940	1,108		41.3%
1950	6,317		470.1%
1960	10,733		69.9%
1970	13,142		22.4%
1980	12,342		−6.1%
1990	11,706		−5.2%
2000	11,586		−1.0%
2010	11,169		−3.6%
2020	11,359		1.7%
2023 (est.)	11,022		−3.0%

=== Racial and ethnic composition ===
Brooklyn city, Ohio – Racial and ethnic composition Note: the US Census treats Hispanic/Latino as an ethnic category. This table excludes Latinos from the racial categories and assigns them to a separate category. Hispanics/Latinos may be of any race.
Race/ethnicity (NH = Non-Hispanic)	Pop 2000	Pop 2010	Pop 2020	% 2000	% 2010	% 2020
White alone (NH)	10,493	8,808	7,378	90.57%	78.86%	64.95%
Black or African American alone (NH)	192	529	988	1.66%	4.74%	8.70%
Native American or Alaska Native alone (NH)	12	12	23	0.10%	0.11%	0.20%
Asian alone (NH)	264	441	651	2.28%	3.95%	5.73%
Pacific Islander alone (NH)	1	0	0	0.01%	0.00%	0.00%
Some other race alone (NH)	8	23	58	0.07%	0.21%	0.51%
Multiracial (NH)	167	191	467	1.44%	1.71%	4.11%
Hispanic or Latino (any race)	449	1,165	1,794	3.88%	10.43%	15.79%
Total	11,586	11,169	11,359	100.00%	100.00%	100.00%

=== 2020 Census ===
As of the 2020 census, Brooklyn had a population of 11,359. The median age was 43.1 years; 17.9% of the residents were under 18 and 20.0% were 65 or older. For every 100 females, there were 89.9 males, and for every 100 females 18 and over, there were 88.3 males 18 and over.

All of the residents lived in urban areas and none lived in rural areas.

As of the 2020 census, 5,266 households were in Brooklyn, of which 22.4% had children under 18 living in them, 33.8% were married-couple households, 23.1% were households with a male householder and no spouse or partner present, and 35.3% were households with a female householder and no spouse or partner present. About 37.8% of all households were made up of individuals, and 15.0% had someone living alone who was 65 or older.

The city has 5,608 housing units, of which 6.1% were vacant. Among occupied housing units, 56.5% were owner-occupied and 43.5% were renter-occupied. The homeowner vacancy rate was 1.5% and the rental vacancy rate was 4.9%.

Racial composition as of the 2020 census
Race	Number	Percentage
White	7,730	68.1%
Black or African American	1,063	9.4%
American Indian and Alaska Native	48	0.4%
Asian	652	5.7%
Native Hawaiian andother Pacific Islander	3	<0.1%
Some other race	738	6.5%
Two or more races	1,125	9.9%
Hispanic or Latino (of any race)	1,794	15.8%

=== 2010 census ===
As of the 2010 census, 11,169 people, 5,153 households, and 2,926 families were living in the city. The population density was 2,628.0 inhabitants per square mile (1,014.7/km^{2}). The 5,506 housing units had an average density of 1,295.5 per square mile (500.2/km^{2}). The racial makeup of the city was 84.3% White, 5.2% African American, 0.2% Native American, 3.9% Asian, 4.0% from other races, and 2.4% from two or more races. Hispanics or Latinos of any race were 10.4% of the population.

Of the 5,153 households, 24.5% had children under 18 living with them, 38.1% were married couples living together, 13.8% had a female householder with no husband present, 4.9% had a male householder with no wife present, and 43.2% were not families. About 37.4% of all households were made up of individuals, and 15.5% had someone living alone who was 65 or older. The average household size was 2.17, and the average family size was 2.85.

The median age in the city was 42.9 years. The age distribution was 19.1% under 18, 7.8% from 18 to 24, 25.8% from 25 to 44, 28.2% from 45 to 64, and 19.2% were 65 or older. The gender makeup of the city was 48.2% male and 51.8% female.

=== 2000 census ===
As of the 2000 census, of 2000, 11,586 people, 5,348 households, and 3,171 families lived in the city. The population density was 2,704.4 inhabitants per square mile (1,044.2/km^{2}). The 5,521 housing units had an average density of 1,288.7 per square mile (497.6/km^{2}). The racial makeup of the city was 92.66% White, 1.69% African American, 0.10% Native American, 2.28% Asian, 1.64% from other races, and 1.62% from two or more races. Hispanic or Latino people of any race were 3.88% of the population.

Of hte 5,348 households, 22.1% had children under 18 living with them, 44.3% were married couples living together, 11.1% had a female householder with no husband present, and 40.7% were not families; 36.5% of all households were made up of individuals, and 15.4% had someone living alone who was 65 or older. The average household size was 2.16, and the average family size was 2.84.

In the city, theage distribution was 18.9% under 18, 7.5% from 18 to 24, 28.4% from 25 to 44, 23.2% from 45 to 64, and 21.9% who were 65 or older. The median age was 42 years. For every 100 females, there were 92.1 males. For every 100 females 18 and over, there were 87.2 males.

The median income in the city for a household was $40,661 and for a family was $46,696. The per capita income for the city was $21,439. About 5.2% of families and 12.0% of the population were below the poverty line, including 6.8% of those under 18 and 6.8% of those 65 or over.

== Economy ==
=== Top employers ===
According to the city's 2021 Comprehensive Annual Financial Report, the top employers in the city are:

Rank	Employer	Number of employees
1	KeyBank	2,544
2	Medical Mutual of Ohio	1,168
3	Wal-Mart Associates, Incorporated	1,032
4	Arrow International	614
5	Lowe's	355
6	Menards	330
7	Inogen	292
8	Cleveland Plain Dealer	280
9	Brooklyn City School District	265
10	Donald Martens and Sons	247

== Notable people ==
- David Birney - actor
- John M. Coyne - mayor from 1948 to 2000, longest consecutive mayoral service in U.S. history
- Lee Fohl, baseball player and manager
- Jim Kavourias - baseball player
- Clint Nageotte - baseball player
- Jim Petro - Ohio politician
- Murray Salem - actor and screenwriter

== See also ==
- Memphis Kiddie Park
