= Converge =

Converge may refer to:

- Converge (band), American hardcore punk band
- Converge (Baptist denomination), American national evangelical Baptist body
- Limit (mathematics)
- Converge ICT, internet service provider in the Philippines
- CONVERGE CFD software, created by Convergent Science

== See also ==
- Comverge, a company that provides software, hardware, and services to electric utilities
- Convergence (disambiguation)
- Convergent (disambiguation)
