= Convergence =

Convergence may refer to:

== Arts and media ==
=== Literature ===
- Convergence (book series), edited by Ruth Nanda Anshen
- "Convergence" (comics), two separate story lines published by DC Comics:
  - A four-part crossover storyline that united the four Weirdoverse titles in 1997
  - A 2015 crossover storyline spanning the DC Comics Multiverse
- Convergence (journal), an academic journal that covers the fields of communications and media
- Convergence (novel), by Charles Sheffield
- Convergence (Cherryh novel), by C. J. Cherryh

=== Music ===
- Convergence (Front Line Assembly album), 1988
- Convergence (David Arkenstone and David Lanz album), 1996
- Convergence (Dave Douglas album), 1999
- Convergence (Warren Wolf album), 2016

=== Other media ===
- Convergence (Pollock), a 1952 oil painting by Jackson Pollock
- Convergence (1999) film by Gavin Wilding
- Convergence (2015 film), an American horror-thriller film
- Convergence (2019 film), a British drama film
- Convergence, a 2021 Netflix film by Orlando von Einsiedel
- "Convergence" (Blood & Oil), a 2015 television episode
- "Convergence" (The Last of Us), a 2025 television episode

== Events ==
- CONvergence, a speculative fiction convention in Minnesota
- Convergence (ABC convention), an annual gathering of gay men of size and their admirers in North America
- Convergence (goth festival), the annual net.goth party

=== Organizations ===
- Convergence (Guatemala), a political party in Guatemala
- Convergence (Mexico), a political party in Mexico

== Science, technology, and mathematics ==
=== Biology and ecology ===
- Convergence (eye), simultaneous inward movement of eyes toward each other
- Convergence (sustainability science), progress towards equity within biological planetary limits in sustainability science
- Convergent evolution, the acquisition of the same biological trait in unrelated lineages

=== Computing ===
- Convergence (routing), the status of a set of routers having the same knowledge of the surrounding network topology
- Convergence (SSL), a distributed replacement for the CA system used by Secure Sockets Layer
- Network Convergence, the combined provisioning of telephone, video and data communication services within a single network

=== Mathematics ===
In mathematics, convergence is essentially the property of having a limit. In particular:

- Convergence space, a generalization of the notion of convergence that is found in point-set topology.
- Limit of a sequence
- Convergent series, the process of some functions and sequences approaching a limit under certain conditions
  - More generally, the process of a sequence or other function converging to a limit in a metric space
  - Pointwise convergence
  - Unconditional convergence
  - Uniform convergence
  - Other modes of convergence (annotated index)
- Convergence of random variables, different forms of stochastic convergence
- Convergence of measures
- A property of dynamical systems studied in stability theory
- A property of abstract rewriting systems
- Convergence (logic), the property that different transformations of the same state have a transformation to the same end state

=== Other uses in science and technology ===
- Convergence (economics), a possible phenomenon also known as the Catch-up effect
- Language convergence, the tendency of languages whose speaker communities overlap significantly to influence each other and become more similar as a result
- Technological convergence, the tendency for different technological systems to evolve toward performing similar tasks
- Convergence of evidence, or consilience, the principle that evidence from independent sources can "converge" to strong conclusions
- Convergent boundary, the movement of two tectonic plates coming closer
- Convergence zone, a region in the atmosphere where two prevailing flows meet and interact
- Convergence zones of sonars; see Sonar
- Gun harmonisation, also called multiple gun convergence
- Convergence (optics), the angle formed between focused rays of light

== Other uses ==
- Convergence (accounting), the goal of a single set of accounting standards to be used internationally
- Convergence (relationship), the tendency of people to become more alike as a relationship progresses
- Convergence Movement, a movement within Christianity
- Convergence objective of the Structural Funds and Cohesion Fund (‘convergence funding’), part of the regional policy of the European Union from 2007 to 2013

== See also ==
- Converge (disambiguation)
- Convergent (disambiguation)
- Divergence (disambiguation)
- Transmedia storytelling
