= Post Street Electric Substation =

Electric substation on the Spokane River in the city of Spokane, Washington

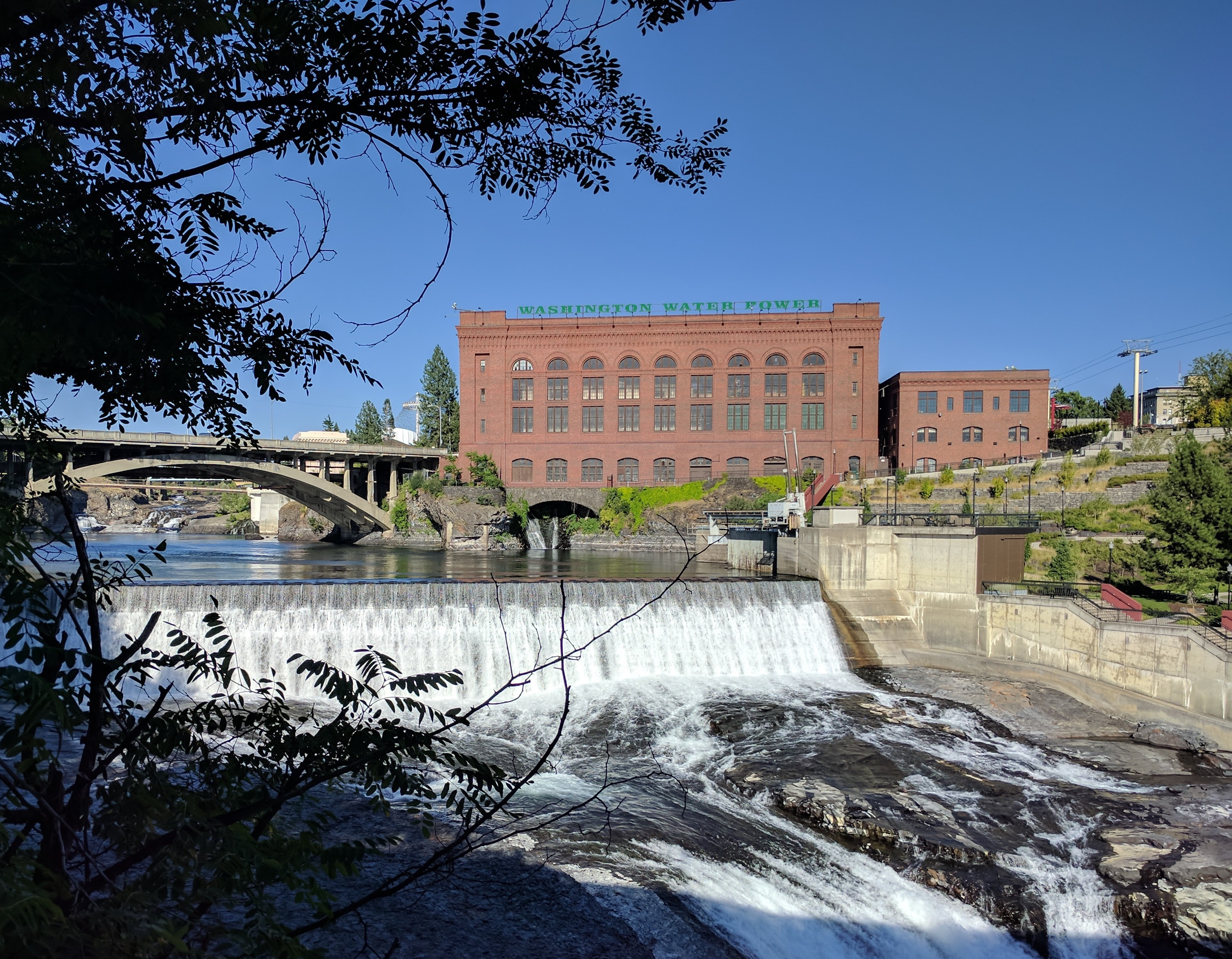
- The Post Street Electric Substation viewed from the Spokane River Centennial Trail on the river's north bank

- Location within Spokane riverfront area

General information
- Architectural style: Romanesque Revival
- Location: Washington, 331 N. Post Street; Spokane, Washington, United States
- Coordinates: 47.66112°N 117.4237°W
- Current tenants: Mobius Science Center
- Groundbreaking: 1909
- Completed: 1910
- Landlord: Avista

Design and construction
- Architect: Kirtland Cutter

The Post Street Electric Substation (also called the Washington Water Power Building, The Washington Water Power Substation) is an electric substation on the Spokane River next to the Spokane Falls in the city of Spokane, Washington. Built in 1910, the Post Street substation served the needs of the city's growing electric grid as well as the surrounding area. The substation consolidates and delivers power generated by the Upper Falls Power Plant and the Monroe Street Dam hydroelectric plants. The building is one of many contributions to Spokane's downtown area by renowned Pacific Northwest architect Kirtland K. Cutter.

== History ==
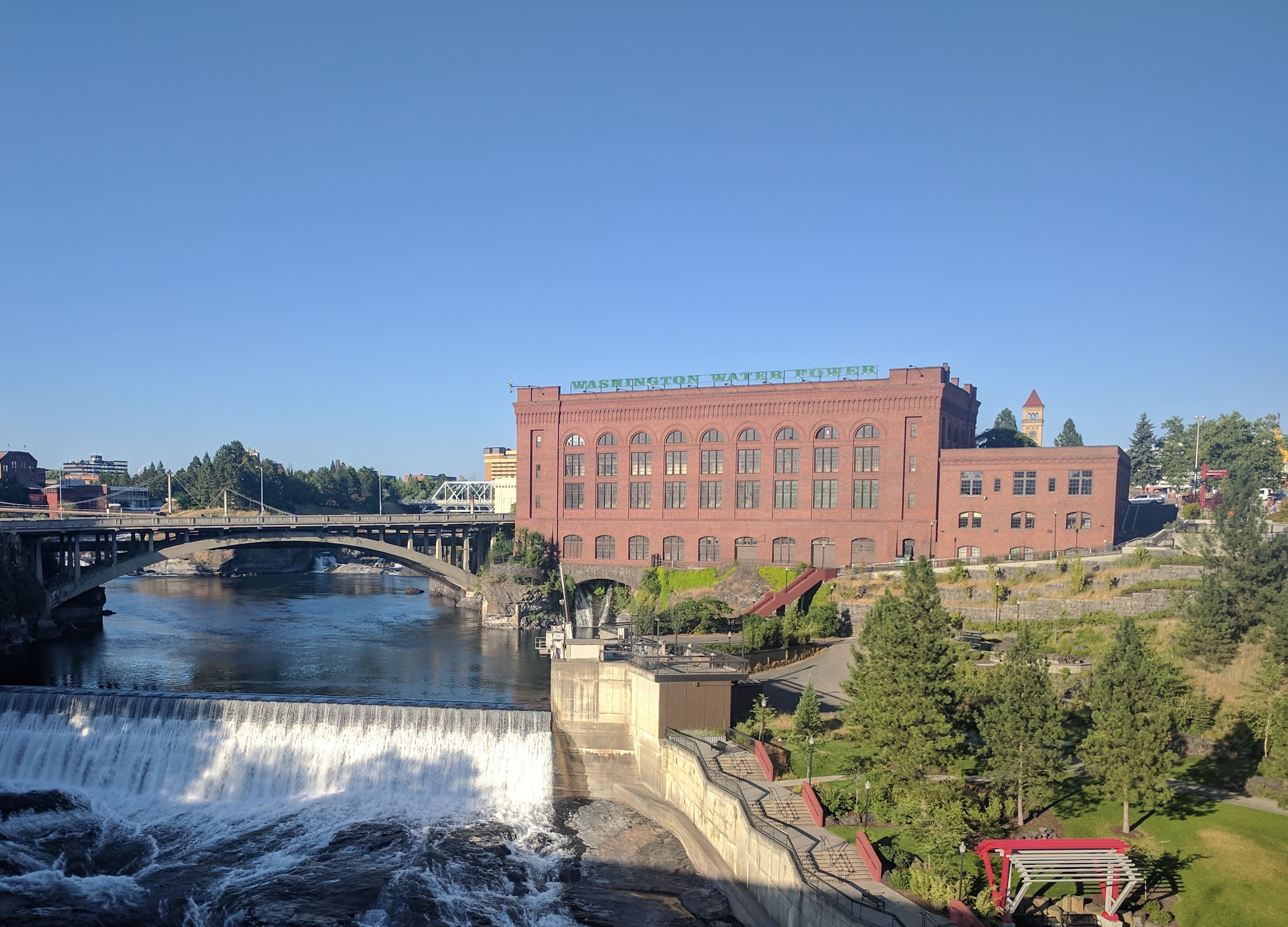
A view of the substation from the Monroe Street Bridge.

The Post Street Electric Substation was designed by Kirtland K. Cutter for the Washington Water Power Company and constructed in 1910 to serve as a low-tension distributing and converting station and as Washington Water Power's primary substation in Spokane. The substation was constructed during the early period of the Washington Water Power Company's development of the city and greater Spokane area, and would continue to be central to its operations in the city. The first transformer on the site was placed in 1909, with six being in place by 1911. The building was designed to have ample interior space in which to expand its capacity. The substation initially delivered power to Spokane's street light and streetcar system, as well as to the growing number of electrified household appliances in the city. The substation continued to power Spokane's streetcar network, which was largely owned by Washington Water Power, until the city abandoned electric streetcars in 1936. When Washington Water Power Corporation rebranded itself as Avista in 1999, the large sign atop the Post Street substation reading Washington Water Power remained unchanged.

=== Mobius Science Center ===
After renovations, the building opened to the public as the new home of the Mobius Science Center on July 1, 2016. Although Avista retains ownership of the building, as a tenant Mobius pays rent of just $1 per year.

== Design ==
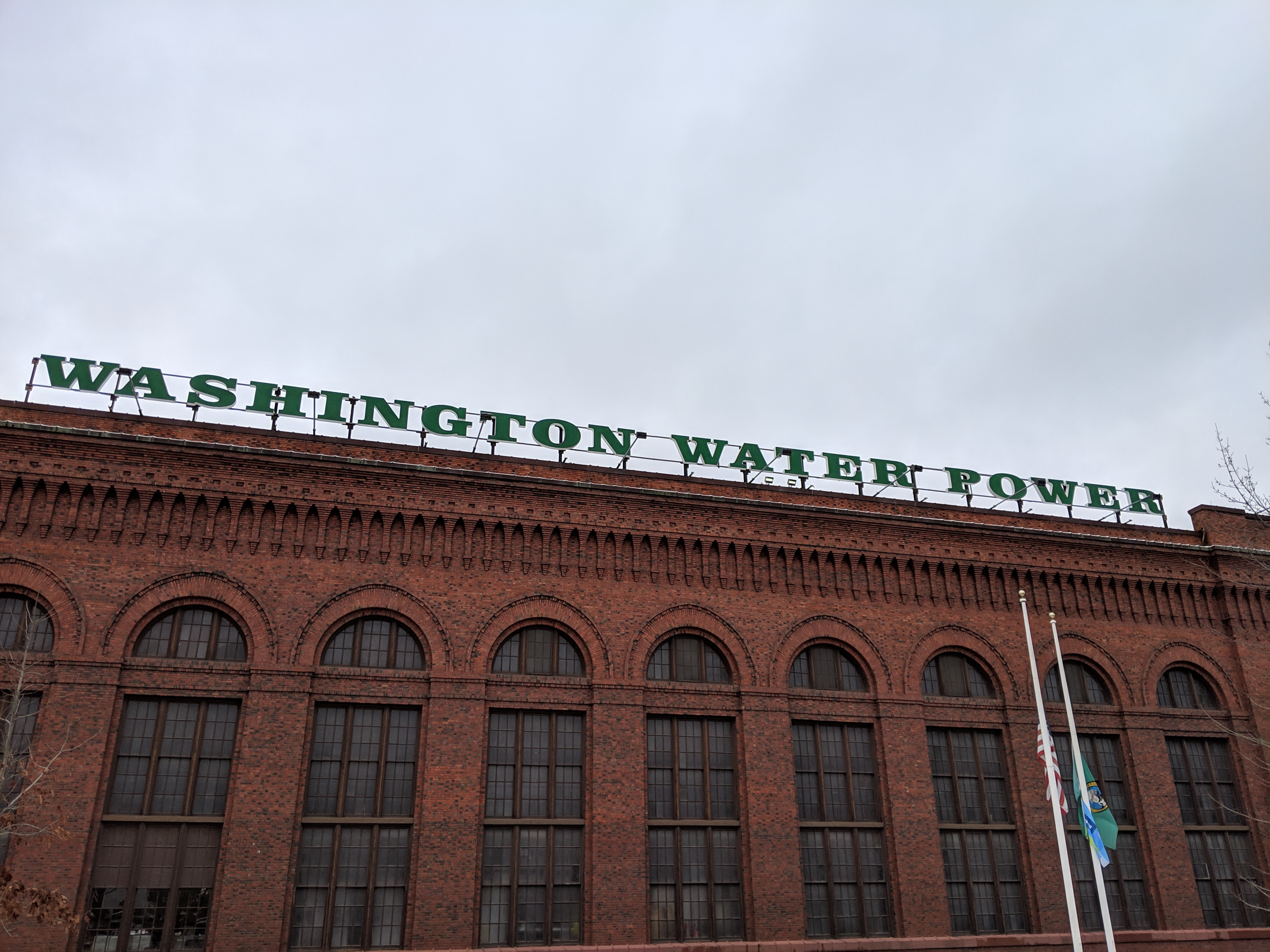
A close-up of the lettering displayed prominently on the east and west sides of the substation.

The Post Street Electric Substation is of brick construction and a concrete base with a foundation on the stony south bank of the Spokane River. The exterior of the building is a façade built to complement the surrounding downtown area as well as to protect the internal electrical equipment, with the interior being mostly empty and containing the transformers and switches necessary for the building's primary function as an electrical substation. As part of Cutter's early contributions to the Spokane downtown landscape, the building is definitive of the area's architectural identity. The sides of the building have tall rectangular glass windows curved off at the top. Originally the substation had skeletal dome frames atop each corner of the building, each flying an American flag. On top of the eastward and westward facing sides there are large signs which read "Washington Water Power" in capitalized green letters, one of the largest such Washington Water Power signs in Washington State and the only remaining publicly-displayed sign bearing the company's former name. Local Spokane columnist Shawn Vestal praised this sign in a 2019 editorial piece, calling it "one hell of a vestige" of the building's past as a fixture of the Spokane landscape.
