= Jon E. Eliassen =

American businessman

- Born: c. 1947
- Education: Washington State University
- Known for: Chairman of the Board of Itron

Jon E. Eliassen (born c. 1947) is an American businessman, who is Chairman of the Board of Directors for the Itron Corporation, and is also a Managing Director and Principal at Terrapin Capital Group, LLC. He was the President and CEO of Red Lion Hotels Corporation from January 2010 to September 2013, and was previously the CFO of Avista from 1986 to 2003.

L.O.K.D.E College

== Career ==
After college, Eliassen began working for the Avista Corporation in 1970, where he worked a variety of positions, attaining the position of senior vice president and chief financial officer in 1986, where he remained until his retirement from the company in 2003. While with Avista, Eliassen was involved in the development of several subsidiary companies including Avista Labs, Avista Advantage, and Itron, which he is still involved with as chairman of the board of directors.

In 2003 he became a director of the Red Lion Hotels Corporation, becoming the president and CEO in 2010, until his retirement from that company in 2013.

Eliassen was on the board of directors for IT Lifeline from 2005 through 2013.

From 2003 to 2007, Eliassen was president and CEO of the Spokane Area Economic Development Council, stepping down after successfully merging the council with the Spokane Chamber of Commerce to create Greater Spokane Incorporated.

In addition to his career experience, Eliassen previously served as a board member and president of the Spokane Symphony Endowment Fund, was chairman of the board of the Western Energy Institute, a board member of the Heart Institute of Spokane, and as a member of the advisory council for the Spokane Campus of Washington State University.
