= Yale attitude change approach =

Model of attitude change first developed during World War II

In social psychology, the Yale attitude change approach (also known as the Yale attitude change model) is the study of the conditions under which people are most likely to change their attitudes in response to persuasive messages. This approach to persuasive communications was first studied by Carl Hovland and his colleagues at Yale University during World War II. The basic model of this approach can be described as "who said what to whom": the source of the communication, the nature of the communication and the nature of the audience. According to this approach, many factors affect each component of a persuasive communication. The credibility and attractiveness of the communicator (source), the quality and sincerity of the message (nature of the communication), and the attention, intelligence and age of the audience (nature of the audience) can influence an audience's attitude change with a persuasive communication. Independent variables include the source, message, medium and audience, with the dependent variable the effect (or impact) of the persuasion.

The Yale attitude change approach has generated research and insight into the nature of persuasion. This approach has helped social psychologists understand the process of persuasion and companies make their marketing and advertising strategies more effective. Like most other theories about persuasion and attitude change, this approach is not perfect. Not a systematic theory about persuasive communications, this approach is a general framework within which research was conducted. The Yale researchers did not specify levels of importance among the factors of a persuasive message; they emphasized analyzing the aspects of attitude change over comparing them.

== Persuasive communication depends on who says what to whom ==
=== Defining the who: the source of communication ===
The effects of credibility rely on the aspects of the speaker to be of "high trustworthiness" or "low trustworthiness". Prominent, credible speakers can drastically persuade more people than others who are not credible. Credible speakers also have a sense of reputation where what they say matters to whom they are speaking to. In addition, attractive speakers have a stronger influence than those who are unattractive, depending on the condition. A study was conducted testing both attractive/unattractive females, as well as strong/weak messages in reference to promoting a sunscreen. They found that people were more willing to be persuaded by a strong message by an attractive female. Contrary to a weak message by an equally attractive female.

=== Defining the what: the nature of the communication ===
The characteristics of the nature of the communication impacts the degree of attitude change. One such characteristic is the design of the message; people tend be more persuaded by messages that don't appear to be targeted for them. By nature, there is a primacy effect that occurs with speakers. People are more influenced by what they hear first. The first speaker is recorded stronger than the following speakers even if the arguments following the first speaker are stronger. If there is a delay after every speech, then it is better to go last because of the recency effect where people remember the most recent event the most.

=== Defining the to whom: the nature of the audience ===
Attitude may change depending on the characteristics of the audience. Audiences that are distracted during the persuasive communication will often be persuaded less than audiences that are not distracted. From the ages of 18–25, people are very susceptible to attitude change. After those ages, people tend to be more stable and resistant to attitude change. Additionally, an audience member that is less intelligent tends to be more persuadable than those with higher intelligence. People who do not enjoy thinking can rely on experts and trustworthy sources to conserve their cognitive resources. If the expert source is untrustworthy, then the person might have to evaluate the material on their own. In most cases, people are not knowledgeable enough to interpret the information themselves or have very low confidence in the issue, thus they must rely on knowledgeable others (expert and trustworthy sources).

== History ==
The Yale attitude change approach (also referred to as the Yale model of persuasion) is considered to be one of the first models of attitude change. It was a reflection of the Yale Communication Research Program's findings, a program which was set up under a grant from the Rockefeller Foundation.

During World War II, political persuasion and propaganda analysis became important fields of study in light of the success of Nazi propaganda campaigns. The Research Branch of the Army's Information and Education Division was assigned this research. Carl Hovland was appointed the Chief Psychologist and director of Experimental Studies for the U.S. He and others undertook the responsibility of conducting, analyzing, and planning experiments that explored the effectiveness of war propaganda. After the war, Hovland, Lumsdaine, and Sheffield published a report of their research findings. These experiments are considered an antecedent to the Yale groups' research. Interest in persuasion remained strong after the war due to advancements in telecommunications. Hovland and others within the "Yale school" returned to Yale in order to continue researching the topic. They established the Yale Communication Research Program which aimed to understand and examine factors that influenced attitude change. It was considered the first modern attempt of such a task.

The Yale Communication Research Program was a "cooperative research and study group" that encouraged members to pursue research in their line of interest regarding the subject of persuasive communication and their effects on behavior and opinion. The Yale group examined attitude change from a learning theory perspective and information processing approach. The Yale school's approach is considered convergent: it started with identifying a phenomenon (attitude change) and then searched for an explanation by looking at variable factors and their effect on the phenomena. This is in contrast to a divergent approach which starts with a theory that is then applied to a phenomenon. The Yale school also suggested that message processing take place in stages: attention, comprehension and acceptance. In essence a person must "first notice the message, and pay attention to it, then comprehend its meaning, and finally accept it". They also introduced the concept of incentive as a crucial variable in influencing attitude change. It was not enough for a response to be learned but that motivation was provided in order to preference one opinion over another.

Hovland, Janis, and Kelly published the group's first empirical findings in 1953. They paralleled their research to Laswell's (1948) statement, "who says what to whom with what effect". In the publication they categorized their findings on the analysis of four factors: "1) the communicator who transmits the communication; 2) the stimuli transmitted by the communicator; 3) the audience responding to the communication; 4) the responses made by the audience to the communication". The Yale school had a breakdown of sub-factors that they observed for each topic (the communicator, the communication, the audience). The fourth topic, which they deemed "responses", was composed of two subtopics which explored the "expression of the new opinion" and "retention of the opinion change". The Yale group had a total of five publications reporting the findings of their experiments (including Communication and Persuasion) that further explored each factor under the same model.

=== Initial/notable studies ===
==== Characteristics of the communicator ====
The Yale group observed the effects of credibility on persuasion. Credibility was composed of; 1) expertness: the degree to which the communicator was knowledgeable in the field, and 2) trustworthiness: in reference to the intentions of the communicator.

Hovland and Weiss in 1951 exposed participants to identical newspaper and magazine articles. Some were attributed to high-credibility sources (like Robert Oppenheimer); others to low-credibility sources (like the Soviet newspaper Pravda). Participants regarded sources with higher credibility more favorably. They attributed this effect to the expertise of the source and the confidence in the sources' sincerity in delivering the message. They also observed that effects from both positive and negative sources tended to dissipate after several weeks.

An exception to the gradual dissociation of the effects of a persuasive message were reported in studies conducted by Hovland, Lumsdaine, and Shieffield. Results showed that opinion change increased gradually over time, despite forgetting the source of the information. They coined this phenomenon the sleeper effect.

==== Content of the communication ====
The Yale school focused on factors such as motivating appeals and organization of arguments in regards to the content of the communication. In particular they focused on emotional appeals which were considered a class of stimuli whose contents could arouse emotion, in contrast to logical/rational appeals. In particular the group looked at fear-arousing appeals.

Janis and Feshbach in 1953 explored degrees of intensities of fear appeal and their effects on conformity in the context of the consequences of poor dental hygiene. The study showed that messages were more effective when contained low-leveled threat references such as "cavities" or "tooth decay" instead of "strong appeal" references, such as exclaiming serious infections that could cause paralysis and kidney damage. The results suggested that appeals of high intensity would be less effective than milder ones.

Hovland, Lumsdaine, and Sheffield explored the effectiveness of one-sided and two-sided messages (containing pros and cons). The 1948 study looked at whether a message given to American soldiers would be more effective if it only advocated one position or if it advocated both sides of the position. It was found that two-sided messages were more effective on budging educated men's opinions. Additionally, two sided arguments were also better at generating change of opinion in those soldiers who opposed the argument initially. For less educated men who also supported the government's position, the one-sided argument was more persuasive. Their findings not only suggested that the content of the communication has an impact on attitude change but so do the attributes of the receiver.

A 1953 follow up study conducted by Lumsdaine and Janis explored the resistance of opinion change motivated by argument structure. The findings summarized that two sided messages were more effective to resistance of counter propaganda regardless of initial position held (even if the initial belief was counter to the new developed belief). Two sided messages were more effective in maintaining sustained opinion change.

Another 1952 study spearheaded by Hovland and Mandel highlighted that messages are more persuasive when they are implicitly argued. The audience is then able to come to their own conclusion. Hovland and Mandel mentioned that this effect may only be evident with less complex issues that can easily be surmised by the audience.

==== The audience ====
The Yale group investigated the audience predisposition, which they defined as the audience's motives, abilities, personalities, and the context of the situation.

Kelly and Volkart confirmed the notion that individuals with greater interest in retaining group membership are less likely to adopt beliefs that contradict group standards. Their findings are consistent with the hypothesis that supports the relationship between internalization of norms and stronger group attachments.

Holland et al. studied the resistance to attitude change when a person is a member of a group and discovered five factors that induce conformity of opinion within a group:

1. the individual's knowledge of group norms
2. the extent to which the individual values group membership
3. the individuals social status or rank within the group
4. particular situation cues
5. salience of the group (the extent to which a specific group is dominant in the individual's awareness at the time the 'counter persuasion' is delivered

Because these five factors play an influential role in inducing conformity, members may resist attitude change when the group is exposed to a message that counters group norms/culture. The more the group membership is valued, the more resistance, to the extent that a boomerang effect may occur.

=== Reception ===
The Yale group did important research in the field of attitude change and persuasion. They brought forth emphasis on the importance of learning theories behind attitude change and laid a strong foundation of mass findings that stimulated further research related to persuasion. Examples of such work that stemmed from their findings was the inoculation theory and the social judgement theory. The research was considered a landmark in the development of attitude change and persuasion.

The model was a major contributor to the development and understanding of attitude change and persuasion, however it is now only one part of many perspectives on persuasion. Research in persuasion is considering the effects of the unconscious, with scholars beginning to explore the possibility of "priming in inducing non-conscious effects". This idea, new to social psychology, is beginning to shed light on the relationship between the individual unconscious and the social environment. The study of persuasion has always been an integral part of social psychology with the focus slowly moving from attitude change and behavior modification to communications, literature, art and the other humanities.

== Theoretical approaches ==
The Yale group's original research "stemmed from a variety of theoretical approaches, including, among others, Hull's learning theory, some motivational hypotheses of Freud and other psychoanalysts, and some of the formulations of Lewin, Sherif, Newcomb, and others". The Yale group developed a theoretical structure linking individual attributes and persuasion based on three major factors: the source of the communication, the nature of the communication and the nature of the audience.

The approach has a similar structure to Aristotle's concept of persuasion in his Rhetoric. According to Aristotle, there are three means of persuasion: the character of the speaker, the emotional state of the listener and logos (the argument itself). Contemporary psychologists use the Yale model's psychological approach and Aristotle's philosophical approach to examine components of persuasion.

=== Legacy ===
==== Influences on McGuire ====
In 1968, William McGuire further broke down Hovland's message processing stages (attention, comprehension, acceptance) into six stages: presentation, attention, comprehension, yielding, retention, and behavior. McGuire proposed that a message must first be presented, drawn attention to, and then understood and comprehended by the audience. This would cause an attitude change, that must be remembered at a later time to actually influence behavioral changes. McGuire emphasized the importance of reception (the attention and comprehension stages of the Yale group) and yielding (anticipation and critical-evaluation steps) in his study of individual differences in influenceability. According to McGuire reception was positively related to ability and motivational attributes. One weakness of the approach is the nature of the yielding step, which assumes that the audience's attitude will change by learning a new message, yet learning does not always result in persuasion. McGuire is best known for his inoculation theory of exploring resistance to persuasion, which was influenced by the Yale school's research on the resilience of two-sided messages on opinion acceptance.

==== Influences on Dolores Albarracín's cognition-in-persuasion model ====
The Albarracín model, which is a stage model developed in 2002, builds off both McGuire's work and the Yale attitude change approach in regards to the sequence of message processing stages. The study found that message processing may occasionally bypass early stages and takes a step towards addressing the role of processing stages on attitude change. The evidence that people can use processing stages in a different order or even skip a stage altogether was the important acknowledgment of this study.

==== Influences on elaboration likelihood model ====
Another model that stems from the Yale attitude change approach is the elaboration likelihood model which is a contemporary approach to persuasion. Developed by Petty and Cacioppo during the late 1980s, the model describes two ways in which persuasive communications can cause attitude change: centrally and peripherally. The central route to persuasion occurs when people have the ability and motivation to listen to a message, think about its arguments and internalize the information. The recipient relies on cognititive responses instead of heuristics when using the central route. The peripheral route to persuasion is used when the recipient has little to no motivation or effort and people are swayed not by the argument itself but by elements secondary to the message (such as the length of the communication or the attractiveness of the communicator). Under the peripheral route, the recipient relies on the context of the situation rather than the information at hand (i.e. they look at attractiveness in this case or if the person speaking is famous or not).

==== Influences on other theories ====
Martin Bauer views the Yale approach from a slightly different angle. In 2008, he argued that persuasion cannot focus only on the social influence of intersubjectivity (the sharing of subjective states by two or more individuals) but must include inter-objectivity (the understandings shared by individuals about social reality). Using the concept of the fait accompli (a completed, irreversible "done deal"), Bauer described artifacts such as nuclear power, information technology and genetic engineering as types of social influence.

== More recent empirical studies ==
Research on external factors which influence individual's attitude has a strong focus on marketing strategy applications. Advances in technology have made mass media a pervasive, $400 billion-plus industry. The average American watches 38,000 commercials a year. There is significant financial interest in examining the impact of source credibility, communicator attractiveness, message context, and mood on persuasion and attitude change.

=== Applications in marketing ===
==== Source credibility and experience claims in consumer advertisement ====
A study by Jain and Posavac examined the role message origin plays in the likelihood that a recipient will believe the message in an advertisement. Advertisements for mountain bikes and cameras were studied; consumers were asked their overall reaction to search claims (claims which can be statistically proven) and experience claims (testimonials). The credibility of the claims was also compared. Participants were shown advertisements for each of the products and asked questions about the advertisements, which contained search or experience claims. The search claim for the mountain bike was its weight, the experience claim was its ease of control. The search claim for the camera was its compactness and the experience claim was its photo quality. The results indicated that consumers were more likely to believe (and be satisfied with) claims if they thought the source was trustworthy or had experience with the product. They were more likely to believe advertisements with concrete evidence behind the claims, such as the weight of the bike or the compactness of the camera. The study demonstrates that the credibility of a source correlates with its ability to persuade.

=== Persuasion ===
==== Attractiveness as an influence on opinion change and persuasion ====
A study by Eagly and Chaiken examined the effects of attractiveness and message content on persuasion. Eagly and Chaiken surveyed undergraduate students on communicators' attractiveness and whether they were persuaded to adopt the speaker's position (desirable or undesirable) on a topic. Students were asked to predict the speaker's position before hearing the message. The study showed that participants were more likely to be persuaded by an attractive speaker to take an undesirable position on a topic than by an unattractive speaker. However, they were equally likely to be persuaded to take a desirable position on a topic by attractive and unattractive speakers. Participants were more likely to agree with attractive speakers in general and more likely to agree with any speaker discussing a desirable position on a topic. More attractive individuals are more persuasive than individuals perceived as less attractive. Message content affects believability; desirable messages are more believable than undesirable ones.

=== Acceptance of message by recipient ===
Hovland states another set of factors that impact attitude change, specifically, in order for the communication to be accepted by the recipient. One such factor is the prestige of the medium on which the message is communicated with. One medium may be more prestigeful than others. Most importantly, "prestige for whom?" is important to specify since certain mediums may be more prestigeful for certain segments of the population. Accordingly, how the medium differs in credibility affects the prestige of the medium; a medium judged by an individual to be the most trustworthy may be the most effective.

A second factor which may affect the comparison of media is the extent of social interaction. In a study by Knower (1935), hearing a speech when a member of an audience is less effective than hearing it individually. Conversely, a study by Cantril and Allport (1935) suggest that radio may be more effective than print because the individual identifies as part of a larger group of people listening to the same program at the same time.

A third factor that affects the likelihood of acceptance of the message by the recipient is the extent to which the medium provides flexibility. Flexibility in this case means the extent to which the medium can canter to special interests and differences in comprehension. Print, for example, is particularly effective by providing for specialized interests and tastes to a greater extent than other mediums. Additionally, a two-way communication network may also induce flexibility. For example, in a political campaign where a two-way communication between the studio and the listener was employed, flexibility was heightened. Accordingly, "questions raised by the man-in-the-street could thus be answered immediately by the political candidate in the television studio"

== Controversy ==
A major issue with the Yale attitude change approach is the fact that it is strictly functional, focusing on a change in attitude and the information processing accompanying it. Other scholars see persuasion as a function of "communication, social influence, and group processes", taking into account other factors such as social influence and the media.

A theory proposed by Margarita Sanchez-Mazas focuses on people's desire for social recognition and dignity. In this model, persuasion is seen as a way to overcome social injustice and achieve recognition and dignity. Sanchez-Mazas examines the roles of majorities and minorities in creating social change, and believes that "persuasion is a simultaneous, reciprocal process between groups, and specifically between majorities and minorities".

A persuasion developed by Clelia Nascimento-Schulze emphasizes communication in a complex society. According to Nascimento-Schulze, technology and the media are used to promote science in developing countries. It was determined that the Internet was most successful at transferring scientific knowledge to the public because it contains an optimal amount of visual information and combines art and science in a creative, informative way. Key to this theory is an "interactive society" with technology allowing communities to share common values and beliefs, such as the Internet.

Another form of public persuasion, studied by Helene Joffe, explores how the media produces visual stimuli which elicit feelings of fear, empathy or disgust. This theory highlights the substantial role of technology in evoking emotion in individuals, focusing on advertising campaigns for health, safety and charities. According to Joffe, visual stimuli lure an audience into a "state of emotion".

The elaboration likelihood model is based on the Yale attitude change model by processing the different outcomes of attitude change. However, there are also claims that they are independent entities that have no connection.
