= Spokane Falls =

Waterfall and dam in Washington

- Stluputqu
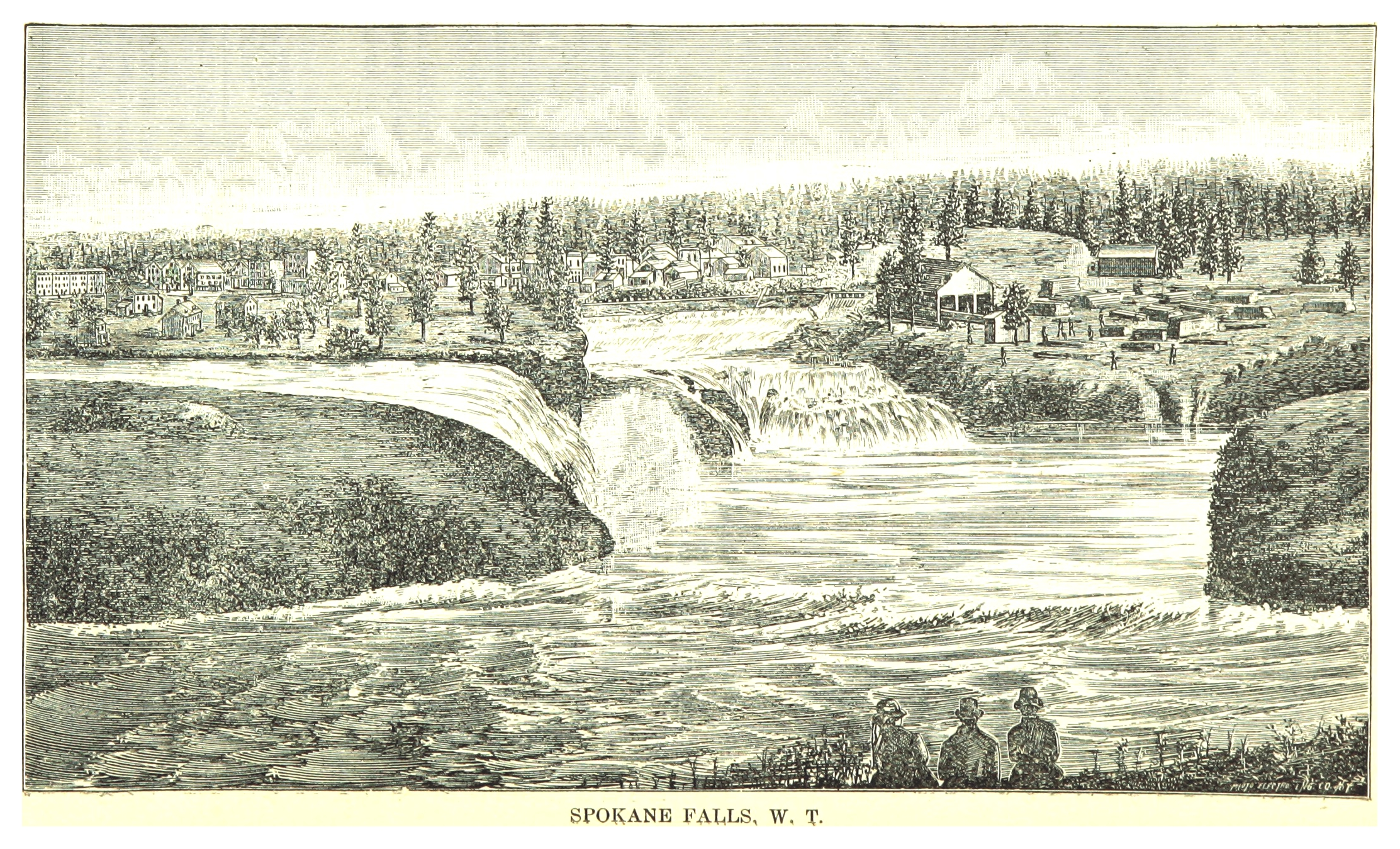
- Interactive map of Spokane Falls
- Location: Spokane, Washington, United States
- Coordinates: 47°39′42.6″N 117°25′28.4″W
- Elevation: 1,771 ft (540 m)
- Watercourse: Spokane River

Spokane Falls is the name of a waterfall and dam on the Spokane River, located in the central business district in downtown Spokane, Washington. The city of Spokane was also initially named "Spokane Falls".

== History ==
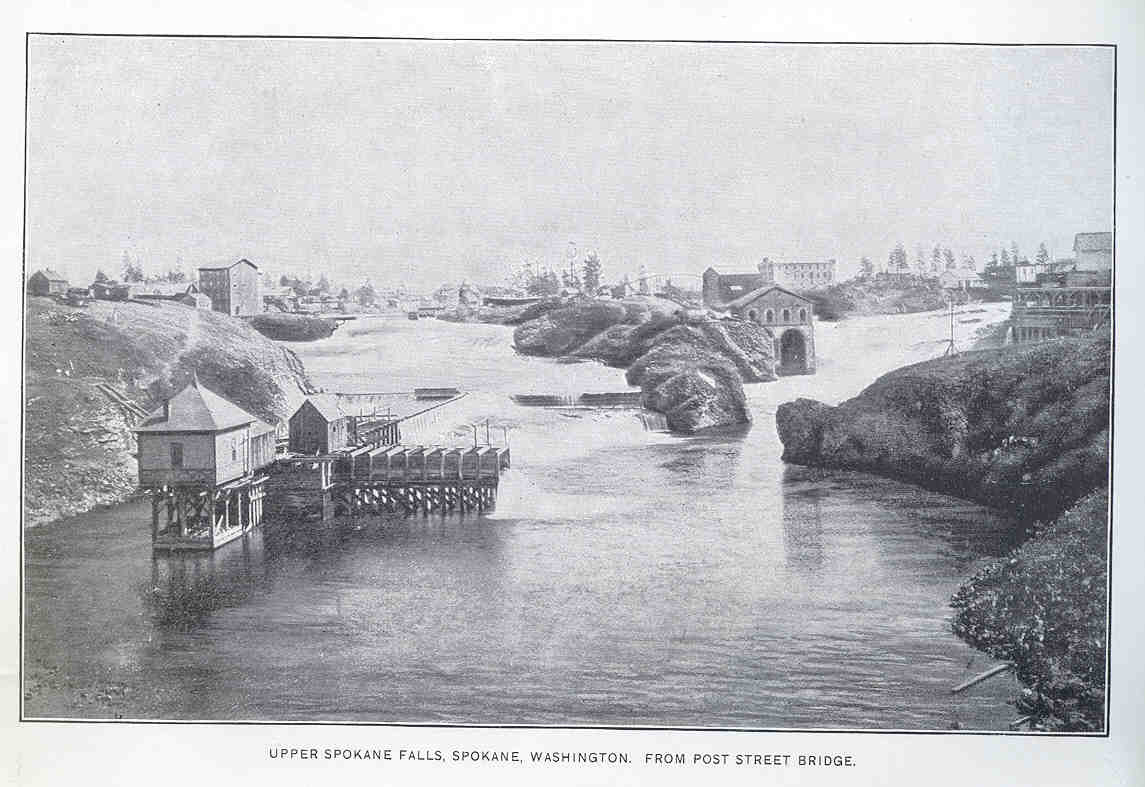
Spokane Falls, 1894

The Native American name for the Spokane Falls was "Stluputqu", meaning "swift water". The falls was once the site of a large Spokane people village.

== Features ==
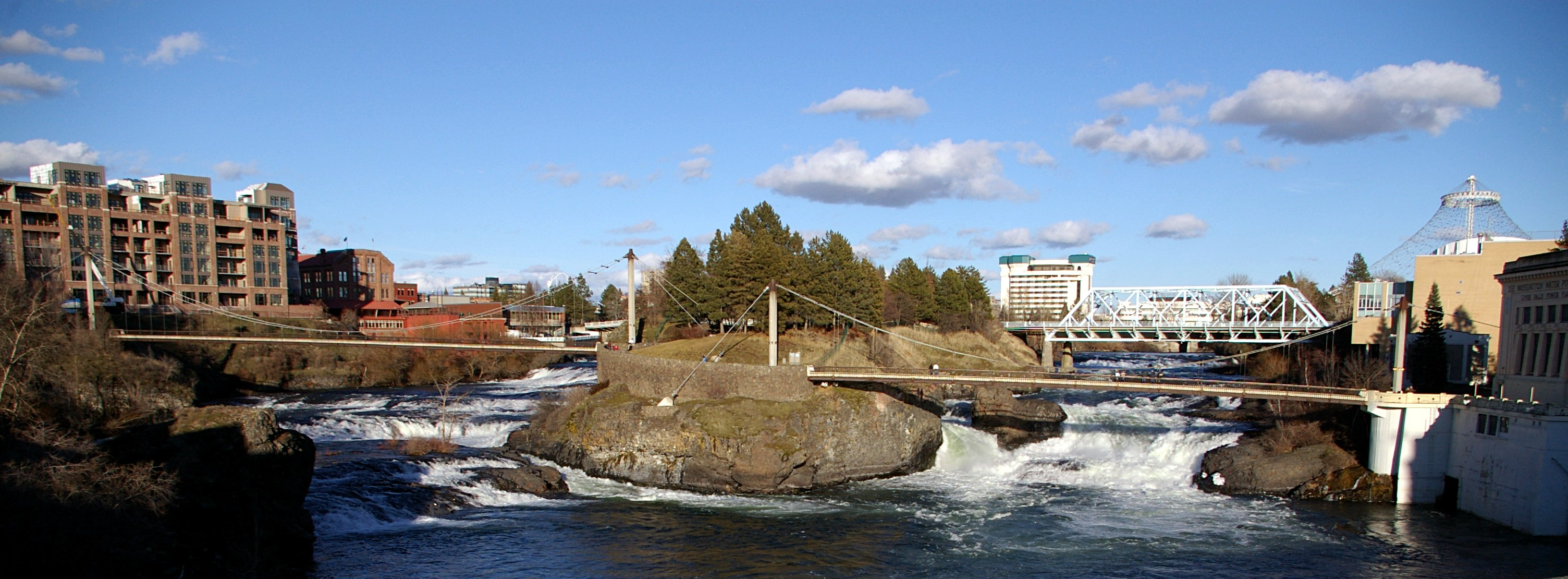
The Upper Falls surrounding Salmon People Island

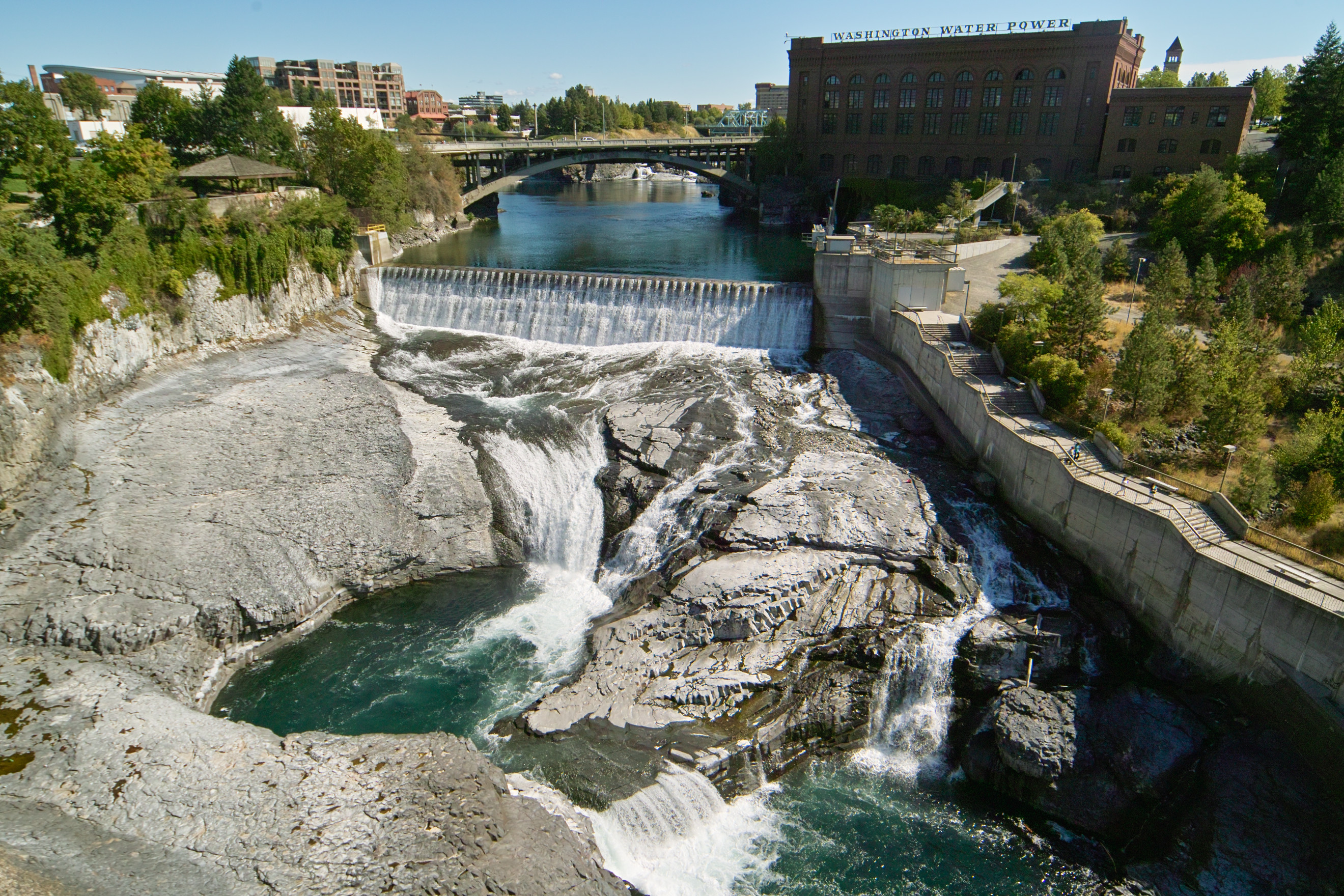
The Monroe Street Dam and the Lower Falls

The falls consists of the Upper Falls and the Lower Falls. The area around the falls was formerly a rail yard, that was converted to a city park for use as the fairgrounds for the 1974 World's Fair. The park is located predominantly on Havermale Island, the east-most boundary is established by the first fork in the river. This is the site of the Upper Falls Dam, a diversion dam constructed in 1920 that directs the water into the Upper Falls intake on the south channel of the Spokane River. The Upper Falls Power Plant incorporates a Francis turbine capable of generating 10 MW.

The water not diverted to the south fork by the dam flows over the Upper Falls. The north fork of the river splits again at Salmon People Island, snxw meneɂ in Salish, and flows over the two Upper Falls on either side of the island. The north fork converges again after the Upper Falls, and is also rejoined by the diverted south fork (through the outlet on the Upper Falls Intake).

The Lower Falls is the site of a second diversion dam, the Monroe Street Dam. Completed in 1890, it was the first dam built on the Spokane River and is currently the longest-running hydroelectric generation facility in Washington state. Its Kaplan turbine has a generating capacity of 14.82 MW.

== Management ==
Both Upper Falls and Lower Falls dams are operated by the power company Avista.

== See also ==
- List of waterfalls
