= Itron =

American technology company

Itron, Inc.
- Type: Public
- Traded as: Nasdaq: ITRI; S&P 600 Component
- Industry: Technology
- Founded: 1977; 49 years ago
- Headquarters: Liberty Lake, Washington, United States
- Key people: Tom Deitrich (president & CEO)
- Products: Smart Meters and Modules; Smart Grid; Data Collection; Analysis Software; Data Management; Water Communication Modules; Internet of Things (IoT); Smart Cities; Demand Response; Professional Services; Sensing + Control; Solar Monitoring; Natural Gas Detectors; Distributed Energy Resources; Smart Streetlights
- Revenue: ▼$2.37 billion (2025)
- Net income: ▲$301 million (2025)
- Number of employees: 5,635
- Website: https://na.itron.com/

Itron, Inc. is an American technology company that offers products and services for energy and water resource management. It is headquartered in Liberty Lake, Washington, United States. The company's products measure and analyze electricity, gas and water consumption. Its products include electricity, gas, water and thermal energy measurement devices and control technology, communications systems, software, as well as managed and consulting services.

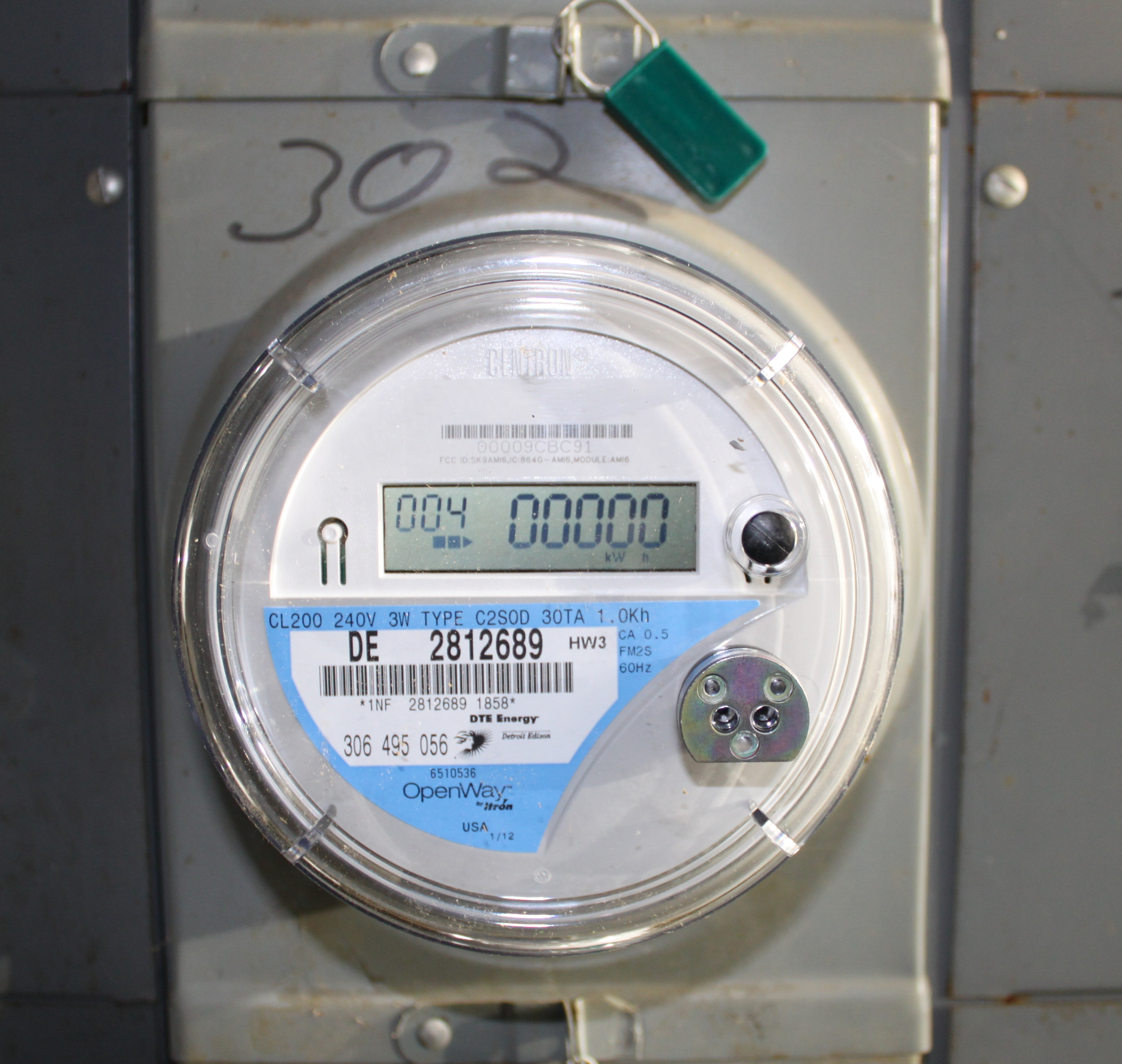
Itron OpenWay electricity smart meter with two-way communications for remote reading in use by DTE Energy

== History ==
Itron, a spinoff of Spokane-based Avista Corp., formerly Washington Water Power Co., was founded in 1977 in Hauser Lake, Idaho when a small group of engineers wanted to build a more efficient way to read utility meters. In 1984, Itron experienced global expansion into the Asian market and developed new manufacturing plants in France and the U.K. By 2006, Itron consulting teams were created to offer services for energy efficiency programs, renewables, conservation and demand response. In 2010, Itron was recognized for its commitment to U.S.-based manufacturing when President Obama announced the award of $2.3 billion in Recovery Act Advanced Energy Manufacturing Tax Credits for clean energy manufacturing projects across the United States.

Within the same year, Itron and Cisco formed an alliance to deliver Internet Protocol (IP) communications to the smart grid market thus changing networking capabilities for utilities. Itron is a founding member of the Smart Cities Council, having joined in 2013. Itron is also a partner of Microsoft CityNext helping with global Smart City initiatives. After developing Itron OpenWay Riva adaptive communications technology (ACT), Itron launched the Itron Riva Developers Community for the Internet of Things, for developers interested in developing software applications for the IoT space.

Itron completed its acquisition of Silver Spring Networks in January 2018; both are American providers of smart meters, grid networks, and software and services. Silver Spring's Gen5 platform, which provided many of the same features as Itron's OpenWay Riva, has been integrated into a common framework.

=== Acquisitions ===
2024 - Itron acquires Elpis Squared
2021 - Itron acquires SELC, a Street Lighting Controls company
2017 - Itron acquires Silver Spring Networks
2017 - Itron acquires Comverge
2012 - Itron acquires SmartSynch, cellular communications and also acquires C&N GasGate Technology for enhanced smart gas distribution systems.
2007 - Itron acquires Actaris Metering Systems.
2004 – Itron acquires Schlumberger Electricity Metering.
2002 - Itron acquires software for distributed system design, field workforce management and energy forecasting.
1996 - Itron acquires UTS, bringing MV-90 metering software application to its product portfolio.
1995 - AEG Meters are acquired with production sites in Italy, Germany, Spain & South Africa.
1993 – Itron acquires two German companies, Heliowatt and Danyl.
1989 - Itron acquires a number of metering companies including Thorn Emi Gas Metering in the U.K. and Bosco Spa in Italy.

== Utilities ==
Various utilities have worked with Itron to deploy smart meters, advanced communications technology, analytics software and other resource management. Below are some of the utilities that have worked and partnered with Itron for smart meter projects.

- North America: CenterPoint Energy; Southern California Edison; Pacific Gas & Electric; BC Hydro; FirstEnergy; DTE Energy; San Diego Gas & Electric; Cleveland Water; Sacramento Municipal Utility District; Glendale Water and Power; Rancho California Water District; Los Angeles Department of Water and Power (LADWP); Florida Power & Light; Public Services Company of New Mexico
- Europe, Middle East & Africa: EDF Energy; Gaz Réseau Distribution France (GRDF); Yorkshire Water; Italgas; Malta Water Services Corporation; State Oil Company of Azerbaijan (SOCAR); Aguas de Valencia; Linea Distribuzione, Stadtnetze Neustadt and Stadtwerke Garbsen.
- Asia Pacific & Australia: Powercor; CitiPower; PT Perusahaan Listrik Negara (PLN); Hong Kong Water; Sydney Water; Mitsubishi Electric Corporation; Tonga Power Limited (TPL).
- South America: Iberdrola; Dominican Corporation of State Electricity Companies; NAMC Algeria; CPFL Energia; Eletrobras; ELO Sistemas Eletrônicos (ELO).

== Cities ==
San Antonio implemented a six-month smart streetlight pilot program in partnership with CPS Energy, AT&T, and Itron.

Through Itron, the city of Chicago overhauled its streetlights with smart LEDs. In March, the city installed 100,000 new lights—approximately one-third of its 270,000 goal. The project, costing $160 million, was predicted to lead to annual energy savings of $10 million.

For the construction of a new highway, the city of Christchurch, New Zealand used Itron to deploy acoustical sensors at the site so the city can create a baseline before the highway is opened.

The city of Copenhagen, which sees the heavy use of bicycles, has enlisted Itron's help to deploy traffic management capabilities with its smart streetlight infrastructure.

The city of Paris plans to deploy sensors with its smart streetlights to monitor moisture levels in soil for water conservation.
