= Divergence (disambiguation) =

Divergence is a mathematical function that associates a scalar with every point of a vector field.

Divergence, divergent, or variants of the word, may also refer to:

== Mathematics ==
- Divergence (computer science), a computation which does not terminate (or terminates in an exceptional state)
- Divergence, the defining property of divergent series; series that do not converge to a finite limit
- Divergence, a result of instability of a dynamical system in stability theory

=== Statistics ===
- Divergence (statistics), a measure of dissimilarity between probability measures
  - Bregman divergence
  - f-divergence
  - Jensen–Shannon divergence
  - Kullback–Leibler divergence, also known as the "information divergence" in probability theory and information theory
  - Rényi's divergence

== Science ==
- Divergence (eye), the simultaneous outward movement of both eyes away from each other
- Divergence (optics), the angle formed between spreading rays of light
  - Beam divergence, the half-angle of the cone formed by a beam of light as it propagates and spreads out
- Divergence problem, an anomaly between the instrumental record and temperatures calculated using some tree ring proxies
- Divergent boundary, a linear feature that exists between tectonic plates that are moving away from each other
- Evolutionary divergence, the accumulation of differences between populations of closely related species
- Genetic divergence, the process in which two or more populations of an ancestral species accumulate independent genetic changes
- Infrared divergence, due to contributions of objects with low energy
- Point of divergence in the study of counterfactual and alternate history
- Ultraviolet divergence, due to contributions of objects with very high energy

== Arts ==
=== Multimedia ===
- Divergent (novel series), a series of young adult science fiction adventure novels by Veronica Roth, published between 2011 and 2018
  - Divergent (novel), the first novel in the series, 2011
  - The Divergent Series, a film trilogy based on the novels, released 2014–16
    - Divergent (film), the 2014 film based on the novel
      - Divergent (soundtrack), the soundtrack to the 2014 film

=== Books ===
- Divergence (novel), a 1991 novel by Charles Sheffield
- Divergence, a 2007 novel by Tony Ballantyne

=== Film ===
- Diverge (film), a 2016 American sci-fi film
- Divergence (film), a 2005 film from Hong Kong

=== Television ===
- Diverged (The Walking Dead), an episode of the television series The Walking Dead
- "Divergence" (Star Trek: Enterprise), a fourth-season episode of Star Trek: Enterprise

=== Music ===
- Divergence (album), a 1972 album by Solution

== See also ==
- Diverging color scheme, for coloring data with a minimum, maximum, and center value
- Convergence (disambiguation)
