= Peter Kelly Senecal =

American mechanical engineer

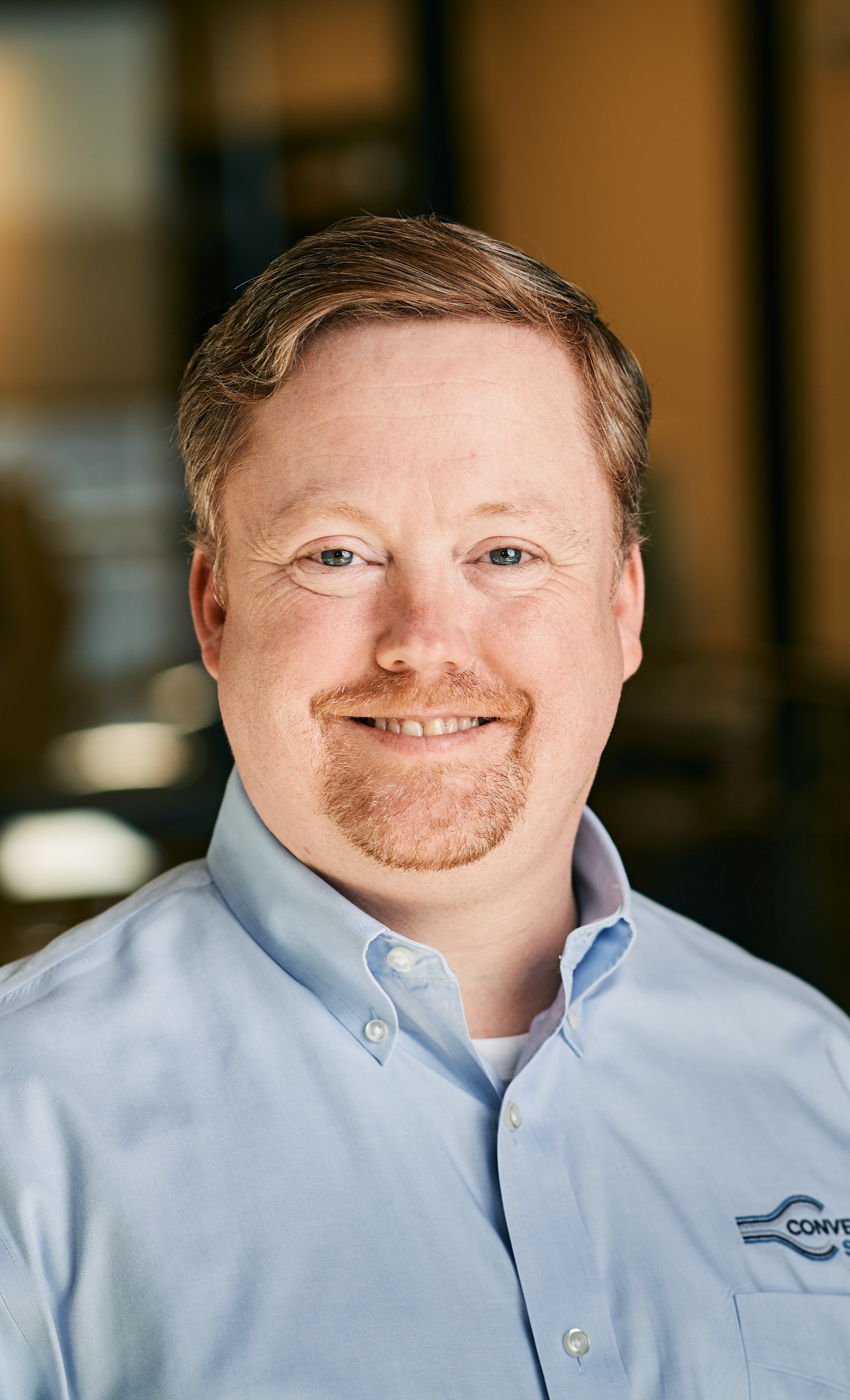
- Occupations: Mechanical engineer, academic and author
- Known for: Co-founding Convergent Science; Developing CONVERGE (computational fluid dynamics software); Promoting technology neutrality in transportation

Academic background
- Education: BA., Physics; MS., Mechanical Engineering; PhD., Mechanical Engineering
- Alma mater: Lawrence University; University of Wisconsin–Madison
- Thesis: Development of a Methodology for Internal Combustion Engine Design using Multi-Dimensional Modeling with Validation through Experiments (2000)

Academic work
- Institutions: University of Wisconsin–Madison; University of Oxford

Peter Kelly Senecal is a mechanical engineer, academic and author. He is a co-founder and Owner of Convergent Science and one of the original developers of CONVERGE, a computational fluid dynamics software. Additionally, he holds positions as a visiting professor at the University of Oxford, an adjunct professor at the University of Wisconsin–Madison, and a co-founder and Director of the Computational Chemistry Consortium (C3).

Senecal is most known for his work on the development and use of computational fluid dynamics in the engine design process, the LISA (Linearized Instability Sheet Atomization) spray breakup model, propulsion technology, and for initiating his trademarked movements "hug your engine" and "the future is eclectic." He has authored and co-authored research articles and two books titled Engines and Fuels for Future Transport (which he co-edited) and Racing Toward Zero: The Untold Story of Driving Green, which received the 2022 Independent Press Award for Environment. He is also the recipient of the 2019 ASME Internal Combustion Engine Award, the 2019 HPCwire Award for best use of HPC in Automotive, the 2021 HPCwire Award for best use of HPC for Data Analytics and Artificial Intelligence and the HPCwire Award for best use of HPC in Industry in 2020, 2021 and 2022.

Senecal is a Fellow of the Society of Automotive Engineers (SAE), the American Society of Mechanical Engineers (ASME) and the Combustion Institute.

Senecal began his transportation technology advocacy in 2016, with his TEDx talk In Defense of Internal Combustion. He has since authored papers, articles, and a book on this topic, as well as spoken at conferences, companies, and universities.

== Education and early career ==
Senecal obtained a bachelor's degree in Physics from Lawrence University in 1995. He earned a master's degree in 1997 and a PhD in 2000, both in Mechanical Engineering from the University of Wisconsin–Madison.

== Career ==
Senecal began his academic career as a Research Associate from 2000 to 2001 and has been serving as an adjunct professor at the University of Wisconsin–Madison since 2018 and a visiting professor at the University of Oxford since 2021.

In 1997, Senecal co-founded Convergent Science, a company specializing in Computational Fluid Dynamics software, where he contributed to the CFD industry through the development of the CONVERGE software, which eliminated the need for a user-defined mesh and introduced a new process. He also co-founded My Virtual Band in 2004, a website facilitating online collaboration for creating open-source music, which was subsequently acquired by Net Music Makers in 2006. He served as the Principal Investigator for a research project of the Office of the Secretary of Defense/Air Force in 2008 and has served as Co-PI for government-funded projects and CRADAs since. In 2016, he co-founded the Computational Chemistry Consortium and worked as the Vice Chair of the ASME Internal Combustion Engine (ICE) Division from 2022 to 2024. He is the Director of the Computational Chemistry Consortium and has been a member of the Board of Advisors for the Central States Section of the Combustion Institute since 2014, and the Chair of the ASME ICE Division Executive Committee since 2024.

== Research ==
Senecal has contributed to the field of mechanical engineering by studying computational fluid dynamics, internal combustion engines, electric motors, fuel chemistry and vehicle life-cycle analysis, holding three patents for his developments.

=== Computational fluid dynamics ===
Senecal researched computational fluid dynamics throughout his career. In a joint study, he modelled Diesel spray flame stabilization, investigating various parameters' impact on flame "lift-off" length, showing agreement with experimental measurements and accurate prediction of ignition delay in a heavy-duty direct injection Diesel engine. He also presented a linear stability analysis of a liquid sheet considering gas effects, surface tension, and viscosity, determining a transition point for simplifying the dispersion relation and correctly forecasting spray characteristics for pressure-swirl atomizers in multi-dimensional simulations. This model, the LISA model, was successfully validated against experimental data. In addition, he simulated an n-dodecane spray flame using LES and a detailed chemistry combustion model, showing differences from RANS predictions and better agreement with experimental data for soot predictions in LES.

Senecal was involved in the development of a new CFD code, employing a modified cut-cell Cartesian technique and advanced numerical methods to simulate complex engine processes. This CFD code, CONVERGE, is now used for applications in biomedical flows, rocket engines, wind turbines, and electric motors.

=== Internal combustion engines ===
Senecal investigated internal combustion engines, looking into possibilities for optimization. With E. Pomraning, K. J. Richards and S. Som, he proposed an advanced spray modeling approach with Adaptive Mesh Refinement (AMR), demonstrating its effectiveness across various spray scenarios with fine cell sizes and verified grid convergence. He also implemented a coupled Volume-of-Fluid (VOF) method for internal nozzle flow and spray modeling, utilizing an Eulerian single velocity field approach to describe near-nozzle dense sprays and validating the results against experimental data.

Senecal pioneered the use of genetic algorithms (GAs) coupled with CFD to achieve more efficient and cleaner engines and received press coverage for his work. He developed the KIVA-GA code to optimize combustion chamber geometry in diesel engines, achieving reductions in emissions and fuel consumption by adjusting nine input variables simultaneously. He later coupled the GA optimization methodology with his company's CFD code, CONVERGE. Additionally, in 2022, he co-edited Engines and Fuels for Future Transport, where he examined the significance of clean transportation, highlighting the enduring dominance of internal combustion engines (ICEs) despite the growing presence of battery electric vehicles (BEVs), emphasizing the ongoing need to enhance ICE efficiency and reduce exhaust pollutants. In 2021 he founded the ASME webinar series "The Future of the Internal Combustion Engine" to help educate the public on the various ways engines continue to be improved around the globe.

=== Fuel chemistry ===
Senecal co-founded and directs the Computational Chemistry Consortium (C3). The first public version of the C3 mechanism, C3Mech3.3, is freely available to the community.

=== Vehicle life-cycle analysis ===
Senecal has studied vehicle life-cycle analysis (LCA) to assess diversity in transportation. In his book co-authored with Felix Leach, Racing Toward Zero: The Untold Story of Driving Green, he discussed sustainable transportation, covering propulsion systems, low-carbon fuels, and regulatory measures, emphasizing the importance of a balanced approach that incorporates both internal combustion engine and electric vehicle technologies to achieve low emissions efficiently. They suggested hybrid systems as the fastest route to reducing CO_{2} emissions in transportation, emphasizing the need for a regional-specific blend of technologies and urging policymakers to set emission reduction targets instead of implementing technology bans.

Later, Senecal and colleagues developed a methodology for comparing emissions from BEVs and hybrid electric vehicles (HEVs) based on marginal electricity emission rates and other publicly available data. At the time of publication, they showed that a mix of powertrain technologies is the best path toward reducing transportation sector emissions until the U.S. grid can provide electricity for the all-electric fleet infrastructure and vehicle operations with a carbon intensity that produces a net environmental benefit. In 2023, he published an alternative blueprint for light-duty transportation decarbonization.

== Awards and honors ==
- 2018 – Elected to SAE Fellow
- 2019 – Award for best use of HPC in Automotive, HPCwire
- 2019 – Internal Combustion Engine Award, ASME
- 2020, 2021, 2022 – Award for best use of HPC in Industry, HPCwire
- 2021 – Elected to ASME Fellow
- 2021 – Award for best use of HPC for Data Analytics and Artificial Intelligence, HPCwire
- 2022 – Independent Press Award for Environment
- 2024 – Fellow of the Combustion Institute
- 2024 – SAE John Johnson Diesel Engine Research Medal
- 2024 – Dedicated Service Award, ASME
- 2025 – Soichiro Honda Medal, ASME
- 2025 – Luminary Award, University of Wisconsin-Madison Alumni Association

== Bibliography ==
=== Books ===
- Racing Toward Zero: The Untold Story of Driving Green (2021) ISBN 978-1-4686-0146-6
- Engines and Fuels for Future Transport (2022) ISBN 978-981-16-8716-7

=== Selected articles ===
- Senecal, P.K; Schmidt, D.P; Nouar, I; Rutland, C.J; Reitz, R.D; Corradini, M.L (September 1999). "Modeling high-speed viscous liquid sheet atomization". International Journal of Multiphase Flow. 25 (6–7): 1073–1097. Bibcode:1999IJMF...25.1073S. doi:10.1016/S0301-9322(99)00057-9.
- Schmidt, David P.; Nouar, Idriss; Senecal, P. K.; Rutland, C. J.; Martin, J. K.; Reitz, Rolf D.; Hoffman, Jeffrey A. (March 1999). "Pressure-Swirl Atomization in the Near Field". SAE Technical Paper Series (Report). Vol. 1. doi:10.4271/1999-01-0496.
- Wickman, D. D.; Senecal, P. K.; Reitz, Rolf D. (5 March 2001). "Diesel Engine Combustion Chamber Geometry Optimization Using Genetic Algorithms and Multi-Dimensional Spray and Combustion Modeling". SAE Technical Paper Series (Report). Vol. 1. doi:10.4271/2001-01-0547.
- Senecal, P. K.; Pomraning, E.; Richards, K. J.; Briggs, T. E.; Choi, C. Y.; Mcdavid, R. M.; Patterson, M. A. (3 March 2003). "Multi-Dimensional Modeling of Direct-Injection Diesel Spray Liquid Length and Flame Lift-off Length using CFD and Parallel Detailed Chemistry". SAE Technical Paper Series (Report). Vol. 1. doi:10.4271/2003-01-1043.
- Senecal, P. K.; Richards, K. J.; Pomraning, E.; Yang, T.; Dai, M. Z.; McDavid, R. M.; Patterson, M. A.; Hou, S.; Shethaji, T. (16 April 2007). "A New Parallel Cut-Cell Cartesian CFD Code for Rapid Grid Generation Applied to In-Cylinder Diesel Engine Simulations". SAE Technical Paper Series (Report). Vol. 1. doi:10.4271/2007-01-0159.
- Senecal, P. K.; Pomraning, E.; Richards, K. J.; Som, S. (8 April 2013). "An Investigation of Grid Convergence for Spray Simulations using an LES Turbulence Model". SAE Technical Paper Series (Report). Vol. 1. doi:10.4271/2013-01-1083.
