= Upper Falls Power Plant =

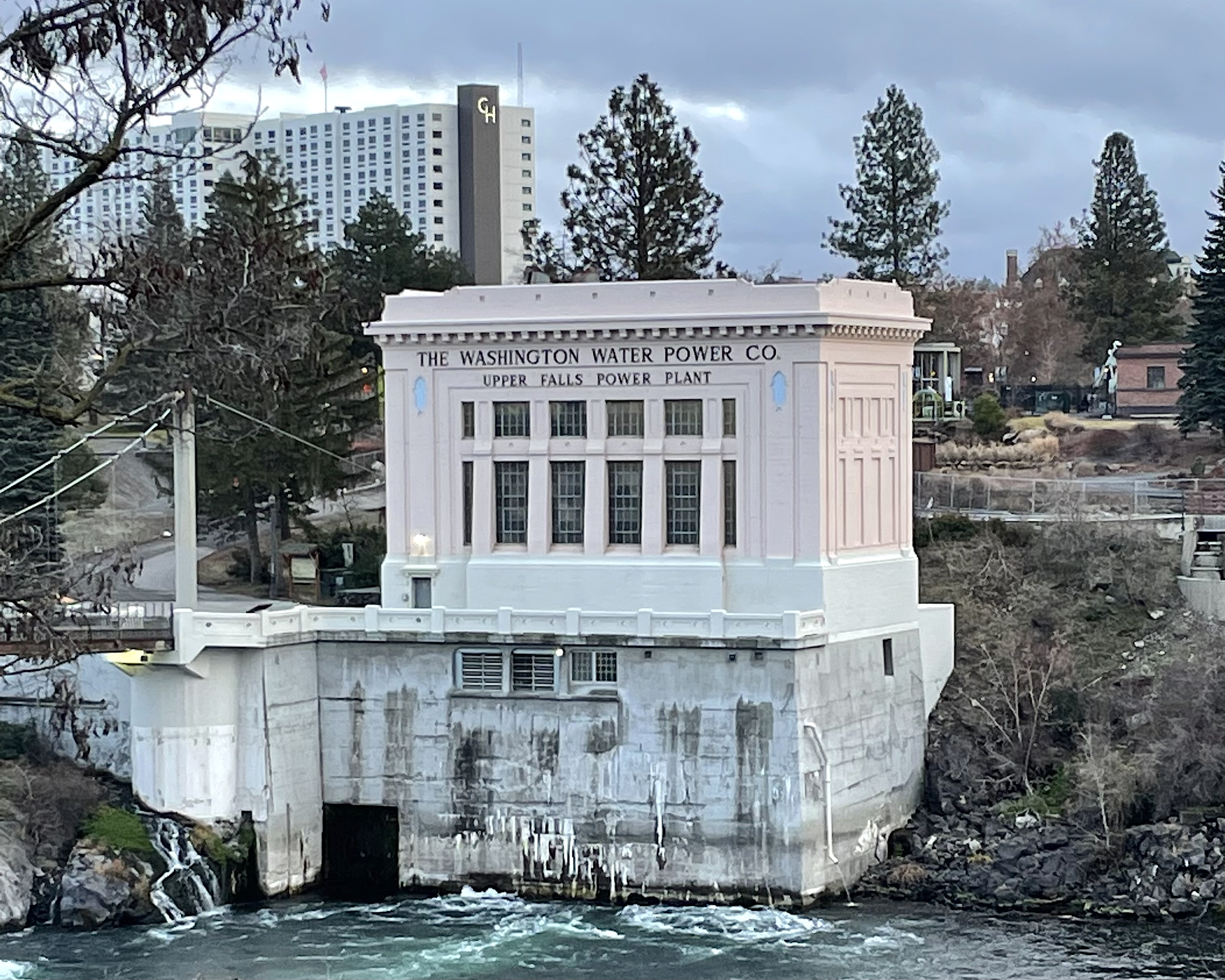
- Upper Falls Power Plant
- Location: Spokane, Washington
- Coordinates: 47.6612868°N 117.4200307°W
- Opening date: 1922
- Owner(s): Avista

Dam and spillways
- Impounds: Spokane River

Power Station
- Turbines: 1
- Installed capacity: 10 MW

Upper Falls Power Plant is a hydroelectric power plant and dam complex on the Spokane River located in Downtown Spokane, Washington. The facility is located on the Upper Spokane Falls in Riverfront Park where the river splits into three branches around snxw meneɂ (formerly known as Canada Island) and Havermale Island. The power plant was completed in 1922 by Washington Water Power and is still operated by the company's successor, Avista.

== History ==
Early settlers to what is now Spokane were drawn to the multiple waterfalls in what is now the heart of the city-center for their potential to power saw and grain mills for the timber and agricultural potential of the surrounding region.

Prior to the development of the Upper Falls Power Plant in 1920, multiple less-advanced generation facilities had existed on the site. Washington Water Power owned the site, and wanted to expand the power generation capability of the location. In 1920, construction began on the current power plant. It was equipped with a vertical turbine, the first of the kind used by Washington Water Power and among the first in the Western U.S. The power plant became operational in 1922 with a capacity of 10 megawatts.

== Facility ==
The diversion dam which forces the Spokane River through the power plant stretches from the western tip of Havermale Island across the north branch of the river to the north bank between Washington Street downstream and Division Street upstream. The dam is approximately 0.4 miles upstream of the power station. Downstream of the diversion dam the river splits into two branches which surround snxw meneɂ (Canada Island). In the diversion channel, which follows the river's southern branch, runs along the south side of Havermale Island. The water in the diversion channel is placid compared to the rapid-filled branches north of Havermale Island and snxw meneɂ due to the presence of the gate house above the power plant. The area surrounding the diversion channel is a popular gathering place for waterfowl and visitors to Riverfront Park.

Water flows from the diversion channel in the south through the power plant just downstream of the tip of snxw meneɂ and immediately upstream of the Monroe Street Dam which harnesses the power of the Lower Falls.

== Gallery ==
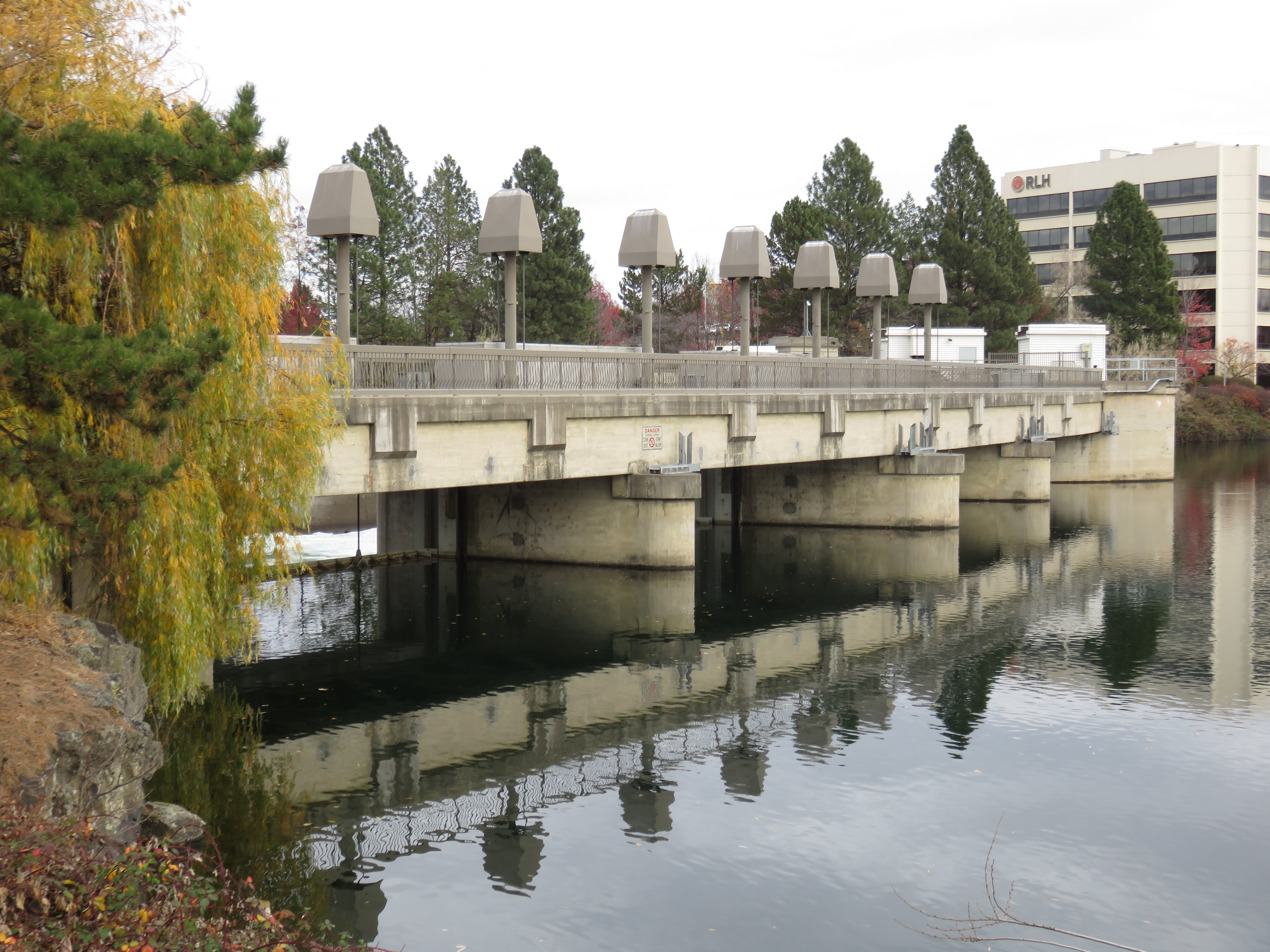
Diversion dam looking downstream

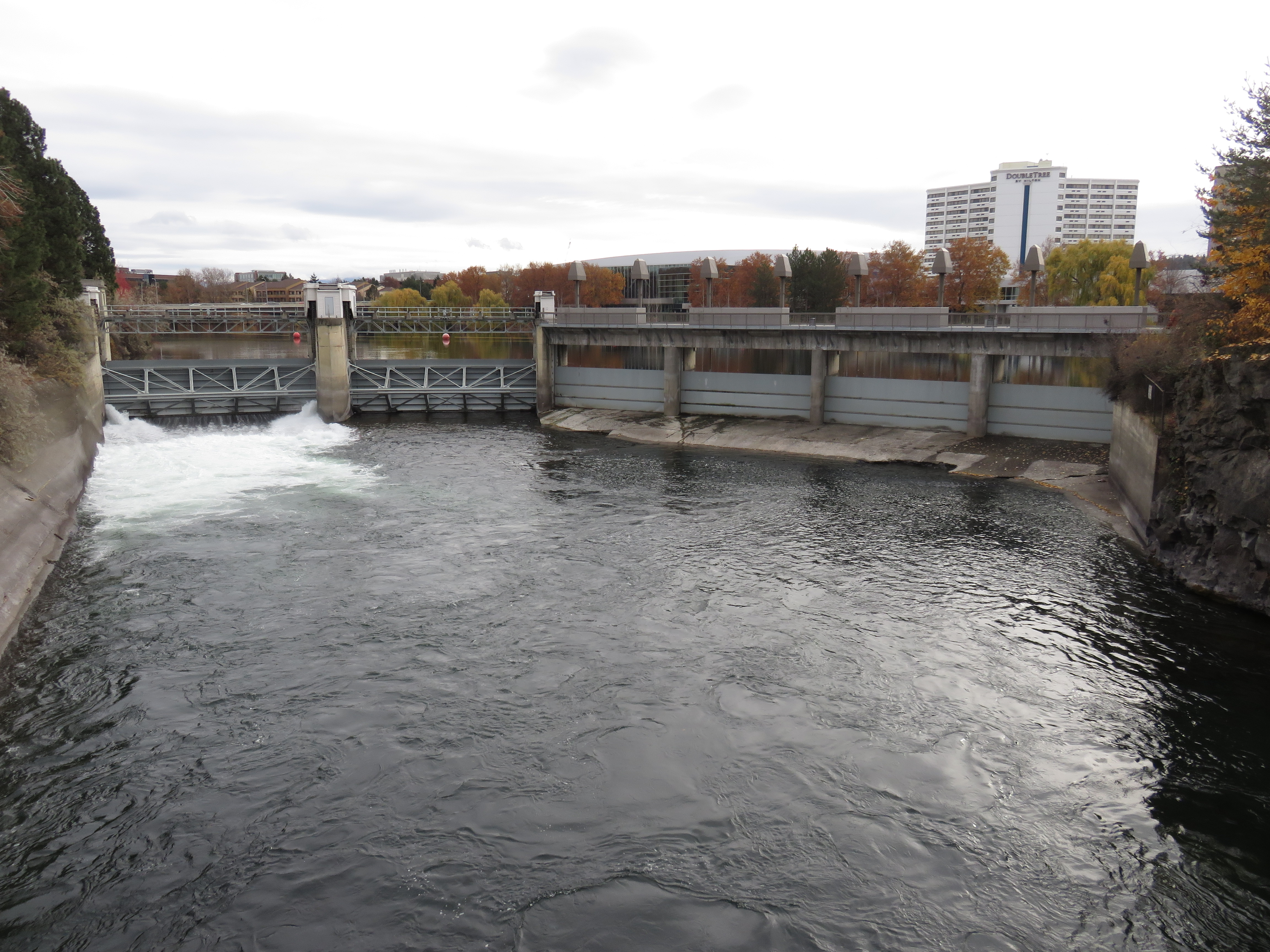
Diversion dam looking upstream

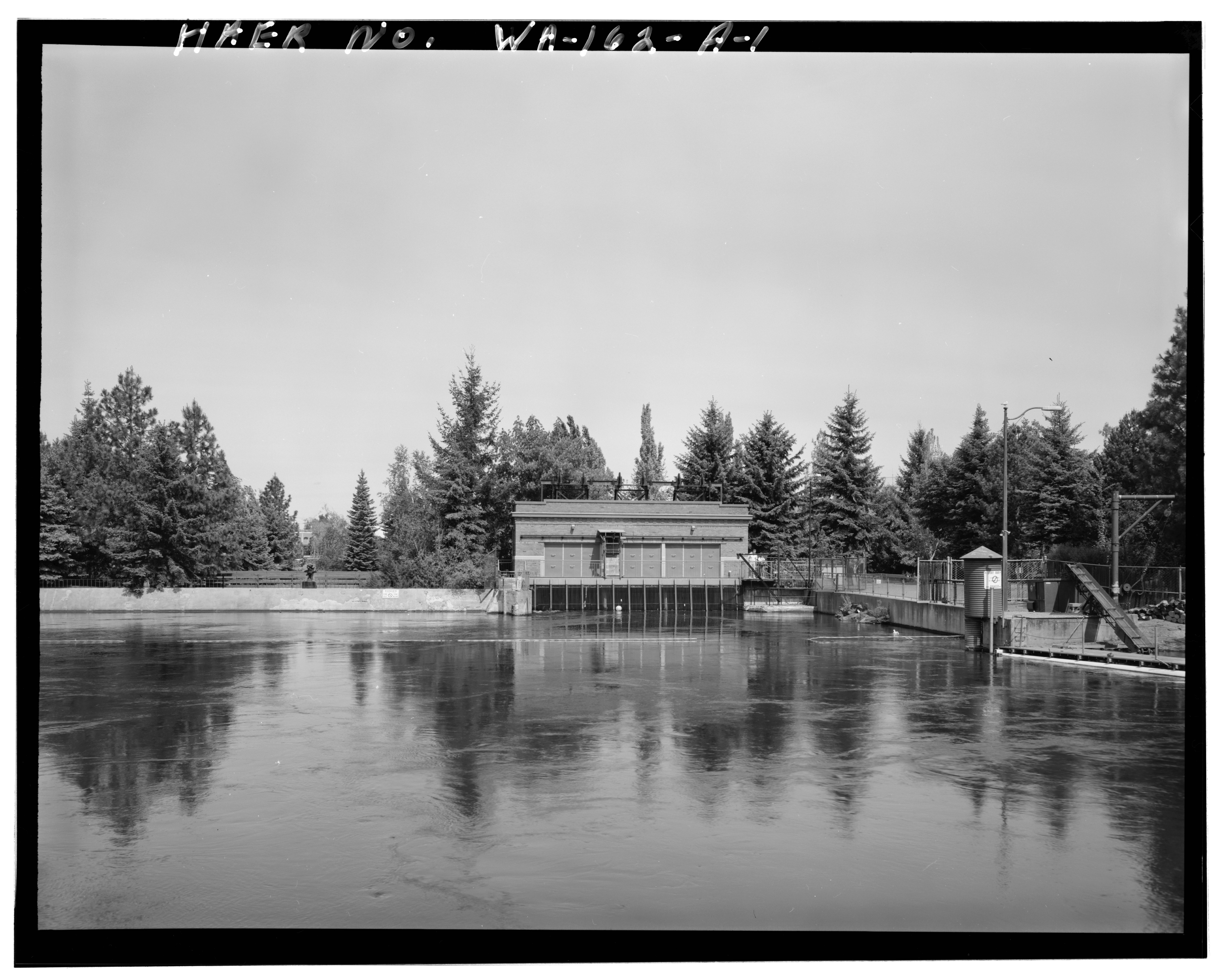
Gate house above the power plant with the diversion channel in the foreground

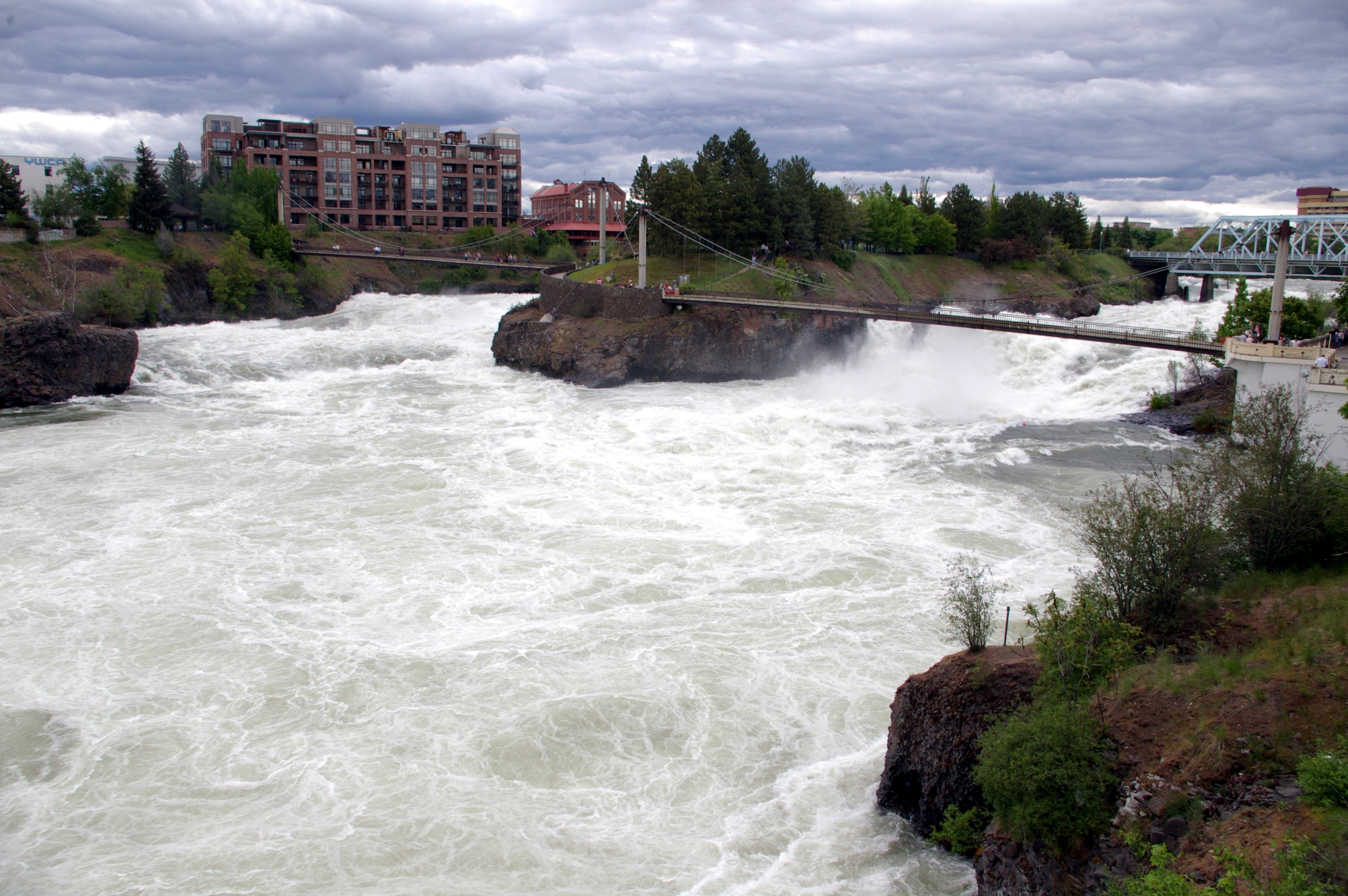
Outflow from the power plant visible on the right among the whitewater

== See also ==
- List of dams in the Columbia River watershed
