= Silver Spring Networks =

Provider of smart grid products

- Industry: Smart Grid
- Founded: July 2002; 24 years ago Milwaukee, Wisconsin
- Defunct: January 5, 2018; 8 years ago
- Fate: Acquired by Itron
- Headquarters: San Jose, California, U.S.
- Area served: U.S., Australia, Canada, Latin America, UK, Europe, Asia
- Key people: Mike Bell (president and CEO)
- Products: IPv6-based smart grid communications network, demand response, demand automation, utility management software, consumer web portal
- Website: www.silverspringnet.com

Silver Spring Networks, headquartered in San Jose, California, was a provider of smart grid products, with offices in Australia, Singapore, Brazil, and the United Kingdom. In January 2018, the company was acquired by Itron for $830 million and was renamed Itron Networked Solutions.

Besides communications devices, Silver Spring Networks developed software for utilities and customers to improve energy efficiency.

== History ==
Silver Spring Networks was founded in July 2002 as Real Time Techomm in Butler, Wisconsin, near Milwaukee. Original founders included Eric Dresselhuys who had worked on related technology since 1995, and Keith Burge. In 2002, funding came from Denver angel investor Jack Thompson.

The company adopted the name of the street in Milwaukee of its original office and was relocated to San Mateo, California in 2003. At this time, Foundation Capital invested $8 million in the company and Raj Vaswani joined the founding team. Ray Bell became interim CEO and chief technology officer, but left to found Grid Net in 2005.

Other investors included Northgate Capital, Kleiner Perkins Caufield & Byers and Google. The company moved its headquarters to San Jose in 2016.

The first large pilot deployment was started in 2007 with Florida Power & Light (FPL) in southern Florida. In 2008, Pacific Gas and Electric Company (PG&E) signed an agreement to provide the company's smart meters, and remained the largest customer for at least several years. On July 7, 2011, Silver Spring Networks filed with the U.S. Securities and Exchange Commission (SEC) to raise up to $150 million in an initial public offering.

On March 13, 2013, Silver Spring Networks became a public company via an initial public offering on New York Stock Exchange, raising $81 million.

== Technology ==
Silver Spring Networks developed equipment that creates wireless mesh networks and transmits energy consumption data between meters, consumers and utilities in real time. The software indicates how much money is spent on electricity and indicates how much can be saved if one switches to energy-efficient models.

The meters in the PG&E deployment include two radios: one in the unlicensed ISM band of 902 to 928 MHz for communication back to the utility provider, and another intended for future communication to a home network. The technology has low bit rate requirements, but also needs to be very low cost.

Silver Spring was a partner with more than 40 companies and provides additional applications to utilities and customers on the Smart Energy Platform like smart thermostats, in-home displays, and electric vehicle (EV) charging technology.

Silver Spring began its technology offering with a smart grid network based on Internet Protocol (IP) technology, which was advocated for the smart grid by the U.S. Federal Communications Commission (FCC) and other smart grid experts. Silver Spring expanded on the network to smart grid application software that includes demand response (DR), demand management and other services for utilities and their customers.

In October 2009 Silver Spring acquired Greenbox Technology, and developed its web-based software into a product called CustomerIQ.

In an Oklahoma Gas & Electric pilot program involving 2,500 homes in the summer of 2010 on Silver Spring's Smart Energy Platform, participants saw an average energy use drop of up to 33 percent during the highest price periods. The pilot consisted of several groups using Silver Spring's web-based energy management solution as well as smart thermostats and in-home energy displays on various dynamic pricing schemes.
