= Convergent Science =

US engineering software company

- Founded: 1997
- Headquarters: Madison, United States
- Website: convergecfd.com

Convergent Science is an engineering software company which has its headquarters in Madison, Wisconsin. The company develops and supports CONVERGE CFD software, a general purpose computational fluid dynamics (CFD) solver.

== Company history ==
Convergent Science was founded in 1997 by a group of graduate students, including Eric Pomraning, Keith Richards, Peter Kelly Senecal, Daniel Lee, and David Schmidt, at the University of Wisconsin–Madison. Initially a computational fluid dynamics consulting company, Convergent Science became a computational fluid dynamics computer software company in 2008 with the release of its CONVERGE CFD software.

Besides the headquarters in Madison, Wisconsin, the company has additional offices in the United States, Europe, and India. Additionally, Convergent Science is partnered with the Japan-based company IDAJ to distribute and support CONVERGE in Japan, Korea, and China.

== Software ==
CONVERGE CFD software is a multi-purpose computational fluid dynamics code for modeling three-dimensional, reacting or non-reacting, turbulent flows. The software package includes coupled flow and detailed chemical kinetics solvers, the graphical user interface CONVERGE Studio, and a license for a limited version of the post-processing and visualization software Tecplot.

CONVERGE features an automated meshing algorithm that generates an orthogonal mesh at runtime and employs Adaptive Mesh Refinement (AMR) to refine the mesh during the simulation in areas with complex phenomena, like moving geometries or fluctuating temperatures or flow velocities. The company refers to this meshing process as "autonomous meshing".

The modeling capabilities of CONVERGE include steady-state and transient simulations for incompressible or compressible flows. The software contains a variety of physical models for phenomena including turbulence, spray, conjugate heat transfer, multi-phase flow, fluid-structure interaction, and surface chemistry.

CONVERGE has been applied for modeling internal combustion engines, fuel injectors, gas turbines, pumps, compressors, and engine after treatment systems. More than 700 peer-reviewed journal articles containing CONVERGE results have been published on these topics.

Users of the software include automotive companies, the motor racing industry, universities, government, and corporate organizations. CONVERGE has been used in the development process for various high-profile projects, including Mazda's SKYACTIV-X, a highly efficient gasoline compression ignition engine, and Ford's EcoBlue diesel engine. Argonne National Laboratory, Caterpillar, and Cummins have employed CONVERGE in several projects aimed toward increasing the fuel efficiency of internal combustion engines. In addition, Intel and Roush Yates Engines work with CONVERGE to design high-performance racing engines.

== See also ==
- List of computational fluid dynamics software
