= Comverge =

- Founded: Whippany, New Jersey (1997)
- Headquarters: Atlanta, Georgia
- Key people: Gregory J. Dukat, Chairman, President, and CEO
- Products: Demand management software platform, smart thermostats, load control switches, marketing services, support services, measurement and verification
- Website: comverge.com

Comverge is an American privately held company that provides software, hardware, and services to electric utilities implementing demand response and energy efficiency programs.

== History ==
Comverge began as divisions of Scientific Atlanta and Lucent Technologies Inc. in 1974 and 1991, respectively. Comverge was organized in 1997 as a Delaware corporation by Acorn Energy, Inc. At this point, the company made the strategic decision in 2002 to develop, own, and operate load management systems for the benefit of electric utilities.

Comverge was a standalone, privately held company owned by H.I.G. Capital, a leading global private equity investment firm with more than $17 billion of capital under management. In May 2017 Comverge was acquired by Itron.

== Activities ==
Comverge has worked with a wide range of investor-owned, public power, and electric cooperative utilities. Notable clients include Pepco Holdings Inc. (PHI), whose Energy Wise Rewards Program with Comverge recruited over 51 percent of eligible households in its Maryland service territory to participate; and the Southern Maryland Electric Cooperative (SMECO), which had recruited 50 percent of eligible households into their CoolSentry program as of October 2013.

Comverge also works with Gulf Power and helped launch the Energy Select program in 2000, which is one of the country's largest and most successful critical-peak pricing programs. The Gulf Power Energy Select program gives more than 14,500 participants greater control over their energy usage. It enables them to pre-program their central cooling and heating systems, electric water heaters, and pool pumps to respond automatically to specific pricing tiers and dynamic price signals from Gulf Power.

Comverge is highly active during each year's summer cooling season, which typically runs from June to September (varying based on region), during which residents’ energy usage spikes due to the use of air conditioners to combat high temperatures. In 2012, Comverge saved its customers 32 gigawatt-hours (gWh) of electricity from June through September, which was equivalent to taking more than 30,000 homes off the grid for one month.
