= Convergence (sustainability science) =

Convergence in sustainability sciences refers to mechanisms and pathways that lead towards sustainability with a specific focus on 'Equity within biological planetary limits'. These pathways and mechanisms explicitly advocate equity and recognise the need for redistribution of the Earth's resources in order for human society to operate enduringly within the Earth's biophysical limits.

The term was first introduced by Phillip A. Sharp and Robert Langer in 2011 in the context of biomedical science. They called for a problem-solving approach that integrated knowledge from the fields of engineering, the physical sciences, computer science, and the life sciences to find solutions to human problems. The idea has since been applied in areas including climate change, environmental health, public health, systemic inequities. and sustainability. One strategy is to add “friction” to undesirable practices and make them harder to do, while making the desired practices “frictionless” or easy to do.

This use of the term 'convergence' harkens from the concept of contraction and convergence (C&C), taking its core principles of Equity and Survival and applying them beyond the frame of greenhouse gas emissions to the wider sustainability agenda.
