= Convergent =

Convergent is an adjective for things that converge. It is commonly used in mathematics and may refer to:

- Convergent boundary, a type of plate tectonic boundary
- Convergent (continued fraction)
- Convergent evolution
- Convergent series

Convergent may also refer to:

- Convergent Books, an imprint of Crown Publishing Group
- Convergent Technologies, a computer company
- Convergents, a Catalan political party

== See also ==
- Convergence (disambiguation)
