= Avista =

American energy company

Avista Corporation

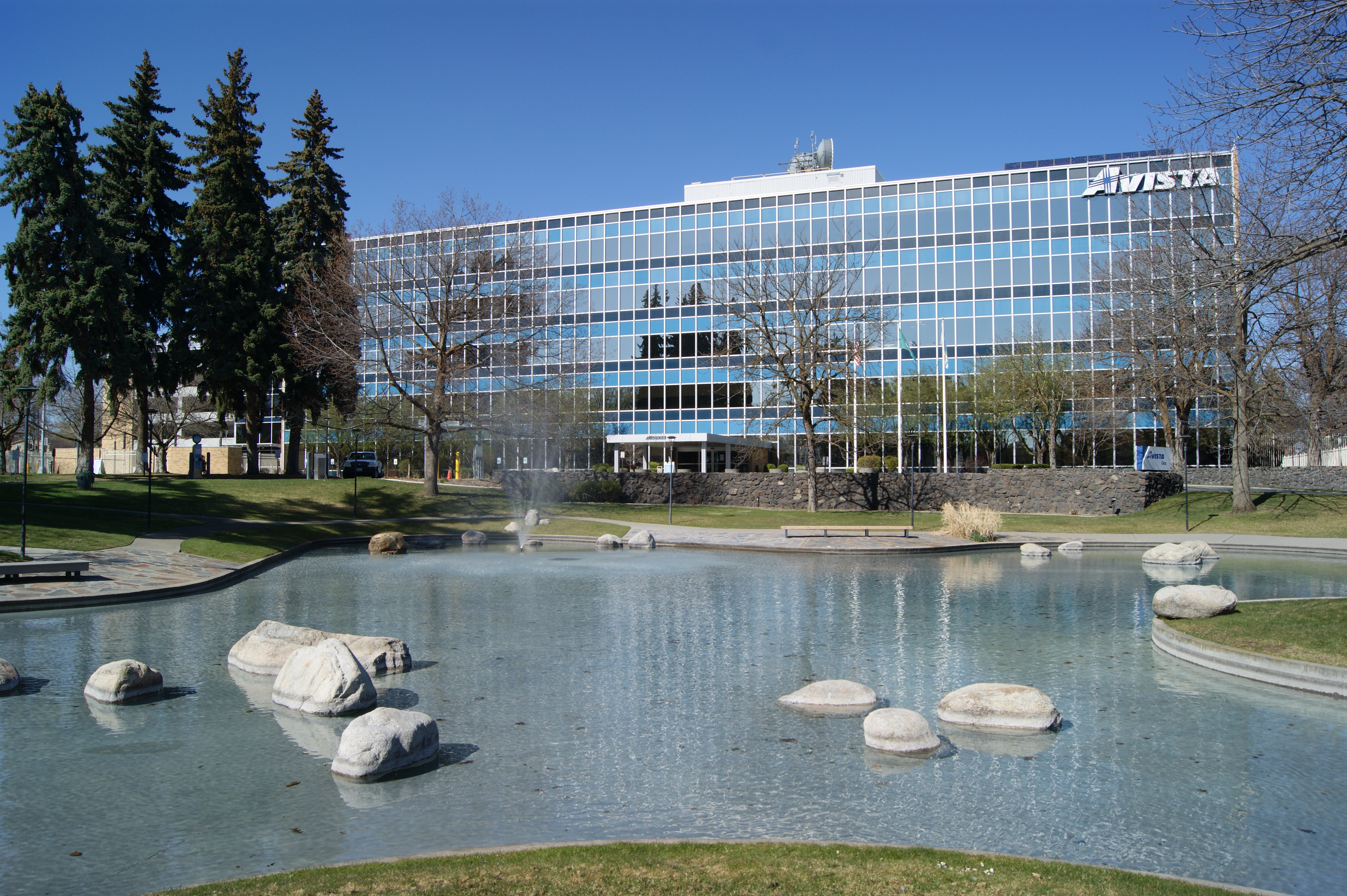
- Avista Utilities corporate offices
- Formerly: Washington Water Power
- Type: Public
- Traded as: NYSE: AVA; S&P 600 component
- Industry: Energy, private utility
- Founded: 1889, 137 years ago (as Washington Water Power)
- Headquarters: 1411 E Mission Ave, Spokane, Washington, U.S.
- Key people: Heather Rosentrater; Chairman and CEO January 1, 2025-present
- Products: Electricity and natural gas
- Revenue: ▲$1.473 billion
- Operating income: ▲$257.6 million (2023)
- Net income: ▲$171 million (2023)
- Number of employees: 1,982
- Subsidiaries: Alaska Electric Light & Power
- Website: www.myavista.com Outage Map

Avista Corporation is an American energy company which generates and transmits electricity and distributes natural gas to residential, commercial, and industrial customers. Approximately 1,550 employees provide electricity, natural gas, and other energy services to 422,000 electric and 383,000 natural gas customers in three western states. The service territory covers 30,000 square miles (78,000 km^{2}) in eastern Washington, northern Idaho, and parts of southern and eastern Oregon, with a population of 1.5 million.

Avista Utilities is the regulated business unit of Avista Corp., an investor-owned utility headquartered in Spokane, Washington. Avista Corp.'s primary, non-utility subsidiary was Ecova, an energy and sustainability management company with over 700 expense management customers, representing more than 600,000 sites. In 2014, Ecova was sold to Cofely, a subsidiary of GDF Suez.

The company was founded 137 years ago in 1889 as Washington Water Power Company. The board of directors approved a name change to Avista Corporation, effective January 1, 1999, and the company began trading under the Avista name on Monday, January 4.

At that time, the company also bought naming rights for Spokane's minor league baseball park, Avista Stadium.

== History ==
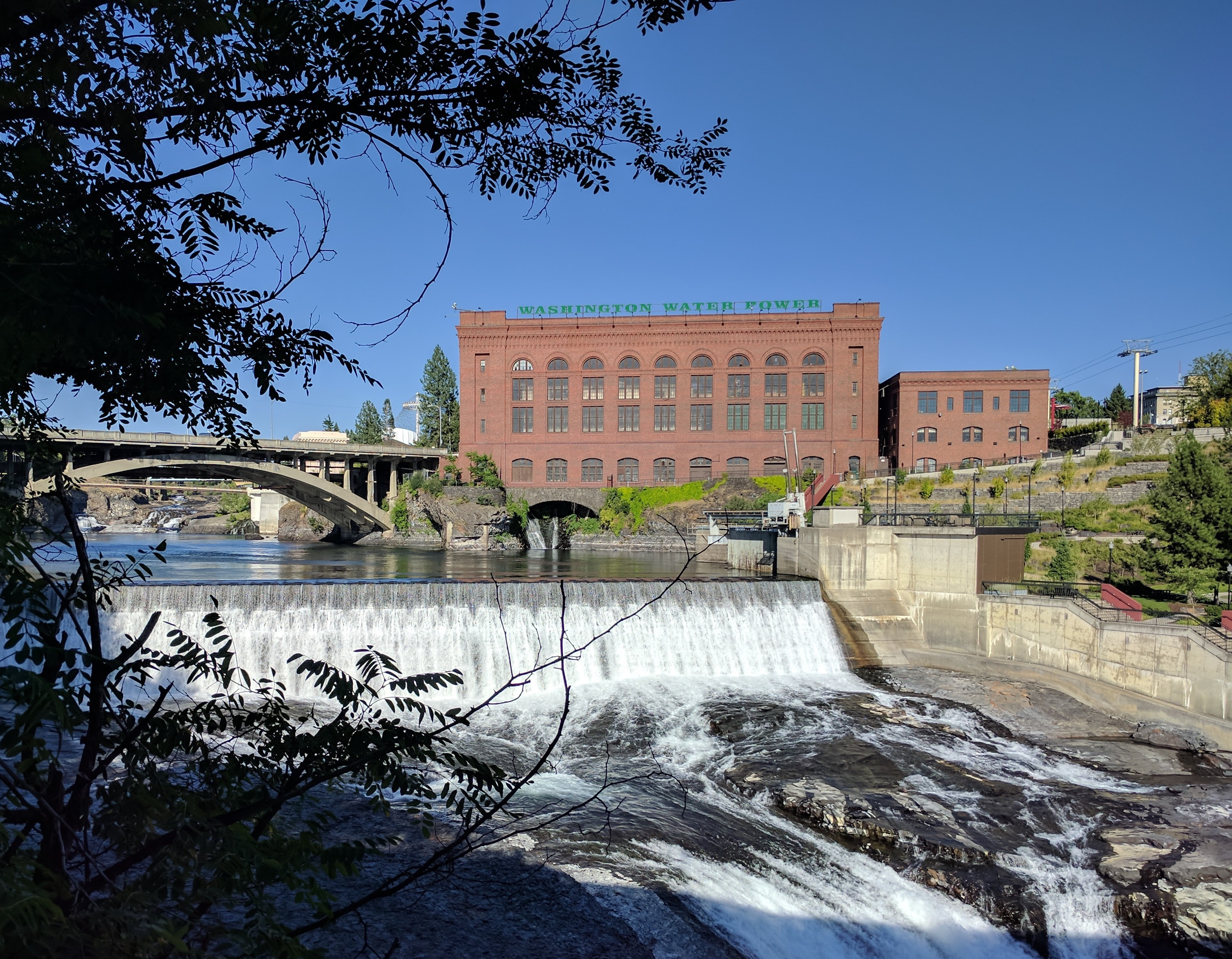
The Post Street Substation, which bears the company's original name, and Monroe Street Dam in downtown Spokane, now operated by Avista

Washington Water Power was incorporated in March 1889 with the aim of generating hydroelectric power from the Spokane River. Earlier in 1889, F. Rockwood Moore, then affiliated with the Edison Electric Illuminating Company, purchased property on both sides of the Spokane River with the intent of developing a power plant for the company. Because of skepticism as to the reliability of hydro power from Eastern investors, and high royalties from Edison Electric, local businessmen including Mr. Moore incorporated the company, sought investors for the new company to build the project.

In the 1890s through the 1930s, Washington Water Power bought up streetcar companies in the city of Spokane and had cornered the transportation market by 1900. Despite seeing a peak in 1910, ridership declined through the 1930s and Washington Water Power's final streetcar line closed in 1936. The company would never again seek to enter the public transportation market.

In 1892 Washington Water Power purchased a park called Twickenham Park on the banks of the Spokane River. The company renamed the attraction Natatorium Park and expanded it with a large swimming pool in 1895 and it became an all-purpose recreation site for the city. Washington Water Power eventually sold the park in 1929. Washington Water Power expanded in Oregon and into California by acquiring the natural gas operations of CP National from Alltel in 1989. The California operations were sold to Southwest Gas in 2005.

In 2014, Avista acquired Alaska Electric Light & Power, the electric utility for Juneau in an all stock transaction worth $170 million.

Avista supports adoption of electric vehicles. In 2016, Avista proposed a two-year pilot program that would install 265 charging stations for electric cars in the eastern part of Washington state. The program was estimated to cost around $3.1 million. It would install fast electric vehicle charging stations in 120 homes, 100 workplaces, and 45 public areas.

In 2017, Ontario-based electrical utility Hydro One agreed to purchase Avista.

In December 2018, The Washington Utilities and Transportation Commission rejected the proposed takeover by Hydro-One, saying the Ontario government (its largest shareholder) led by recently elected premier Doug Ford, had interfered politically in Hydro One's business affairs, most glaringly ordering the removal of CEO Mayo Schmidt, who he dubbed "the Six Million Dollar Man" during the election, and vowing to fire him if elected.

== Lawsuits ==
On September 27, 2002, Avista was sued for issuing false and misleading statements concerning its business and financial condition, including failing to disclose that Avista was engaged in highly risky energy trading activities with Enron and Portland General Electric. On December 20, 2007, Avista agreed to a $9.5 million settlement.

== Restatement ==
On February 20, 2002, the company voluntarily adjusted the amount originally allocated to IPR&D, stating its intent to restate its third quarter 1998 consolidated financial statements accordingly

.

== Other media ==
In the movie Vision Quest, Matthew Modine's character Louden Swain can be seen running over the Monroe Street Bridge with “Washington Water Power” prominently displayed in the background on the historic Washington Water Power Post Street Electric Substation.
