= Sexual harassment =

Unwanted sexual attention or advances

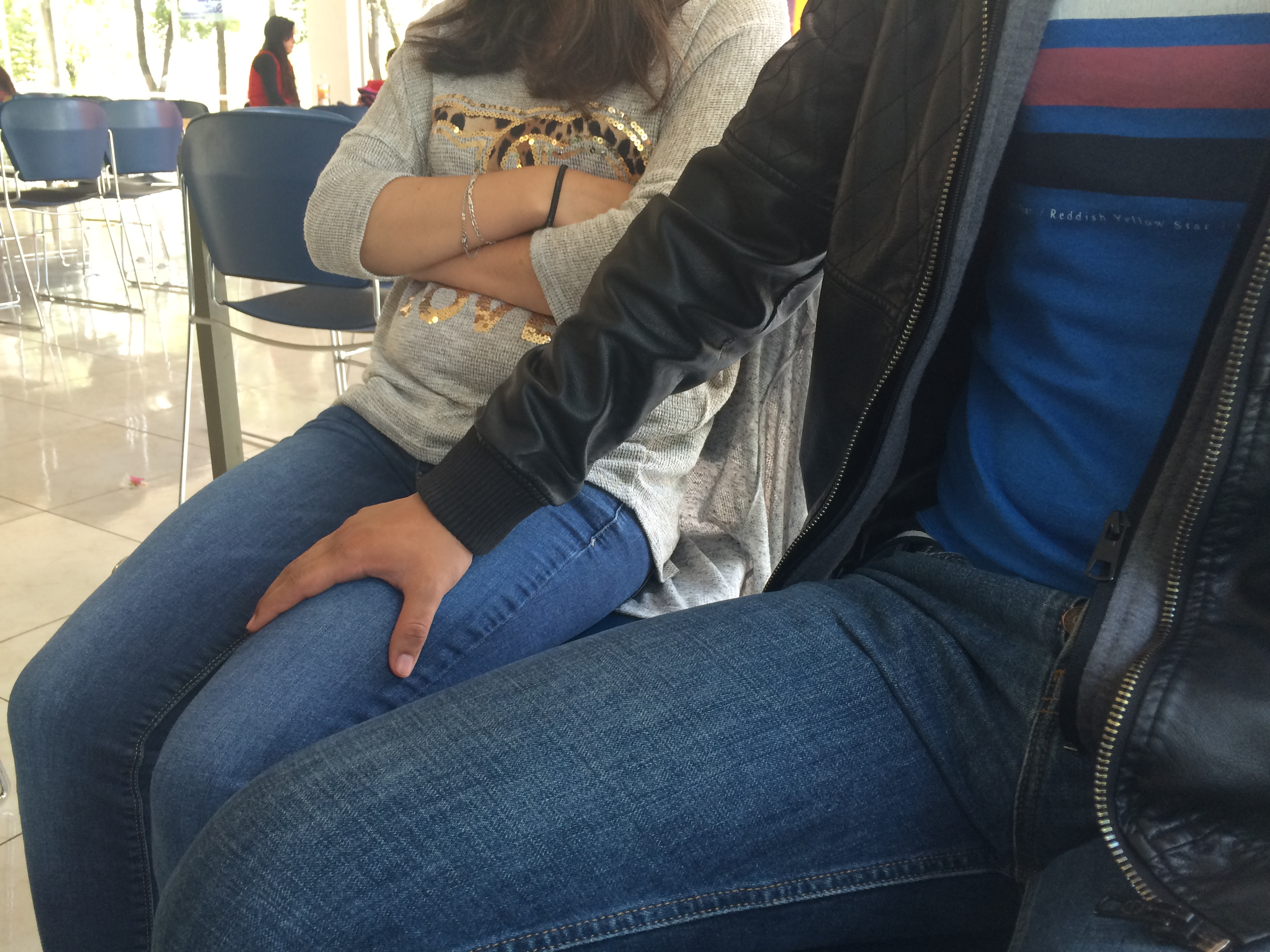
Acted depiction of a man making an unwelcome sexual advance on a woman by putting his hand on her thigh

Sexual harassment primarily refers to harassment involving unwanted sexual behavior, though it may occasionally refer to harassment with a sexist targeting pattern. Although some types of sexual harassment seem to be motivated by sexual desire, they are more often committed to hurt women, hurt men, or punish people for violating gender norms. Popular understanding of sexual harassment primarily focuses on sexual coercion and unwanted sexual advances, which are less common than other types of harassment. All types of sexual harassment can harm a victim's physical and mental health and affect their personal and professional lives.

Sexual harassment may involve harassers or victims of any gender, occur between friends or strangers, involve equal or subordinate relationships, and consist of verbal, physical, or indirect actions. Examples may involve insulting sexual or sexist remarks, offensive sexual innuendo, indecent exposure, sexting, sexual roleplay, collecting or disseminating photos of the victim in private moments, demanding or requesting sexual favors as bribery, and sexual assault like groping or rape.

In most countries, certain types of workplace sexual harassment are illegal as a form of employment discrimination. The legal and social understanding of sexual harassment varies by culture. Employment laws do not impose a "general civility code", so they generally do not prohibit minor isolated harassment incidents. In many countries, harassment may be considered illegal when it is frequent or severe enough to create a hostile or offensive work environment, or when it results in an adverse employment decision (such as the victim's demotion, firing, or quitting). Over 100 countries have laws against both hostile environment and quid pro quo types of sexual harassment, and dozens have laws specifically addressing sexual harassment based on sexual orientation or gender identity. For many businesses or organizations, preventing sexual harassment and defending employees from sexual harassment charges have become key goals of legal decision-making.

== Etymology and history ==
The term "sexual harassment" was coined in the 1970s, and its meaning and popularity as a concept have grown over time. However, the behaviors it describes are common across cultures and eras, and have also been described by other terms. Although discussion of sexual harassment has frequently been silenced and trivialized over time, reports of workplace sexual harassment have been documented since at least the 1600s.

The framing of sexual harassment as a legal issue also originated in the 1970s. Since the 1990s, many countries have adopted laws targeting sexual harassment, and social movements like #MeToo have raised awareness of the concept and spurred social and legal change.

=== The term "sexual harassment" ===
These activists, Lin Farley, Susan Meyer, and Karen Sauvigne, went on to form Working Women United, which, along with the Alliance Against Sexual Coercion (founded in 1976 by Freada Klein, Lynn Wehrli, and Elizabeth Cohn-Stuntz), was among the pioneer organizations to bring sexual harassment to public attention in the late 1970s. Farley also wrote a book to raise awareness, Sexual Shakedown: The Sexual Harassment of Women on the Job, first published by McGraw-Hill in 1978. Sexual Shakedown inspired the first workplace training video on sexual harassment.

=== Legal view ===
The legal understanding of sexual harassment developed through lawsuits women brought forward in the U.S. in the 1970s and 1980s. The development of U.S. laws on sexual harassment in workplaces shaped similar developments in other countries. Many of the women pursuing the earliest U.S. cases were African American, often former civil rights activists, who applied principles of civil rights to sex discrimination. Early precedent was set with Williams v. Saxbe (1976) and Paulette L. Barnes, Appellant, v. Douglas M. Costle, Administrator of the Environmental Protection Agency (1977) which determined it was sex discrimination to fire someone for refusing a supervisor's advances.

In 1979, American legal scholar and activist Catharine MacKinnon published a seminal book called Sexual Harassment of Working Women. She popularized the argument that some workplace sexual harassment was consistent with sex discrimination and therefore prohibited behavior under Title VII of the Civil Rights Act of 1964. MacKinnon also developed the legal classification of sexual harassment types, as quid pro quo or hostile environment harassment. MacKinnon's arguments were key to developing international legal understandings of sexual harassment.

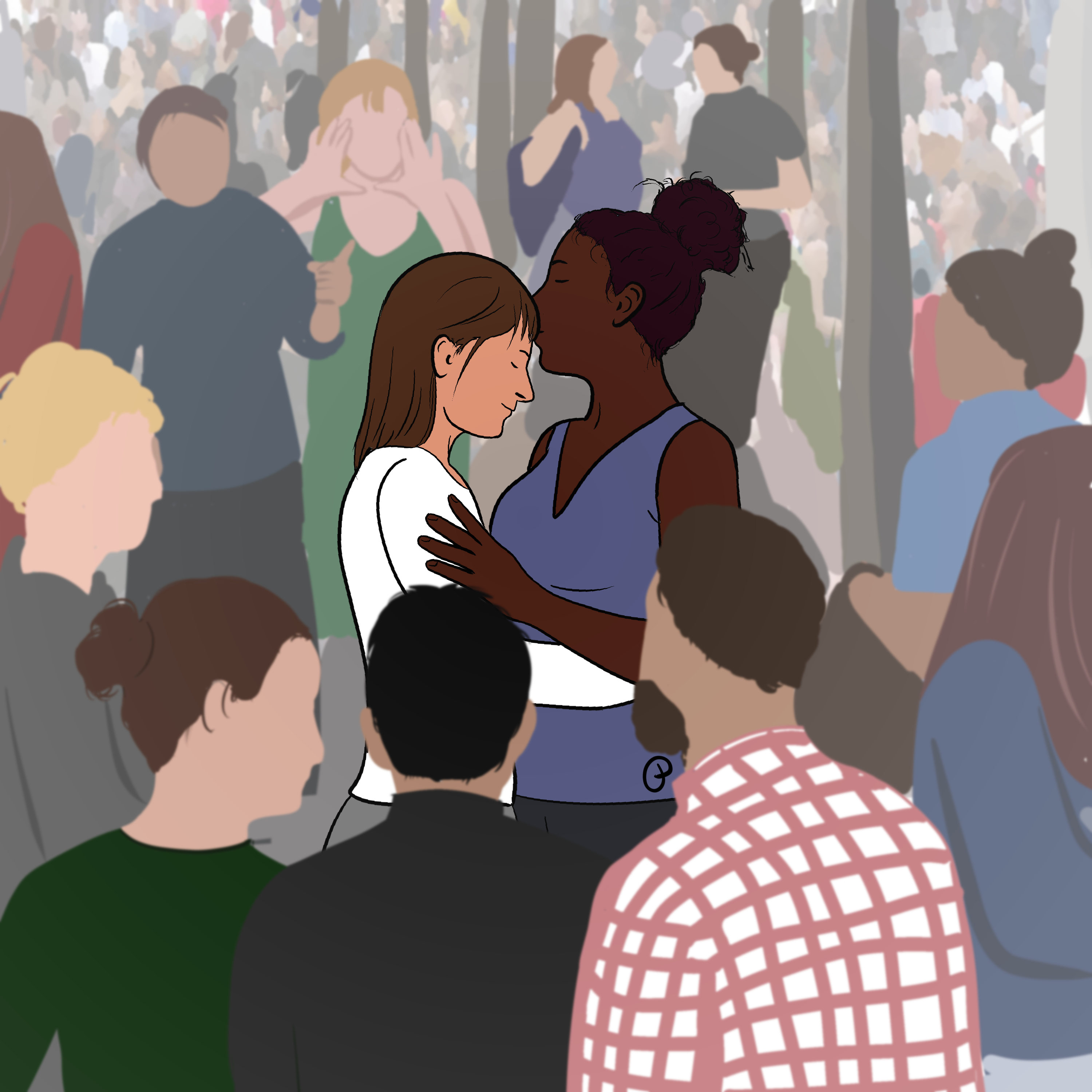
Harassment regarding sexual orientation, rather than gender alone, is recognized as a form of sexual harassment under some laws.

In the U.S., sexual harassment case law continued soon after with Bundy v. Jackson (1981), the first federal appeals court case to hold that workplace sexual harassment was employment discrimination. Five years later the Supreme Court agreed with this holding in Meritor Savings Bank v. Vinson. Another pioneering legal case was Alexander v. Yale (1980), which established that the sexual harassment of female students could be considered sex discrimination under Title IX, and was thus illegal. The first class-action lawsuit, Jenson v. Eveleth Taconite Co., was filed in 1988 (concluding nine years later).

Similar precedents were set throughout the 1980s in the UK based on the 1975 Sex Discrimination Act. Throughout the late 1980s, other countries began to establish laws against sexual harassment, and by 1994, Australia, Belgium, Canada, Denmark, France, Germany, Ireland, Japan, the Netherlands, New Zealand, Norway, Spain, Switzerland, and Sweden had established laws targeting sexual harassment. By 2021, 142 countries had laws against sexual harassment in the workplace, with 103 countries prohibiting both quid pro quo and hostile environment harassment. 39 countries had laws explicitly prohibiting sexual harassment based on sexual orientation, and 24 countries explicitly addressed harassment based on gender identity.

=== Beyond sexual advances ===
Definitions of sexual harassment have changed over time, and common legal definitions now differ in some ways from those used by psychologists and other researchers. All tend to incorporate an element of unwelcome behavior, but researchers often define sexual harassment by the behavior that occurred, while legal definitions focus on whether certain requirements are met.

Over the 1980s and 1990s, psychologists defined gender harassment as a key subtype of sexual harassment. Gender harassment is a class of verbal or nonverbal behaviors that insult or provoke based on gender: examples include sexual comments or jokes, sexualized imagery, and comments based on gendered stereotypes. Notably, all of these examples were provided in Rowe's original 1973 Saturn's Rings report on sexual harassment and discrimination. There are many motivations for gender harassment, but two important ones are sexist beliefs and gender policing. Both factors cause gender harassment to reinforce existing gender roles, causing legal scholar Katherine Franke to label gender harassment as "a technology of sexism".

Gender harassment has nothing to do with sexual attraction and is not a type of sexual advance. This can make it confusing that it is a type of sexual harassment, because the word "sexual" seems to imply underlying sexual desire. Initial legal and social theories of sexual harassment often viewed it as motivated by sexual desire. However, explanations of the underlying cause later changed to a male desire to dominate or a desire for anyone to maintain their sex-based social status. These theories reframe sexual harassment as harassment based on sex or gender, rather than something inherently sexual. Various legal and sociological definitions of sexual harassment include non-sexual, sexist behavior, but the emphasis on the word "sexual" means the definitions often cause confusion and debate. Some laws explicitly cover unwanted sexual and sex-based behavior under their definition of "sexual harassment," while others define sex-based harassment and sexual harassment as two different types of harassment. Some researchers have advocated for the term "sexual harassment" to be replaced with "sex-based harassment" to emphasize the fact that these types of harassment center on gender, not the presence of sexual desire in harassment.

In the late 1990s, some legal scholars began to advocate for more explicitly including gender harassment in sexual harassment law, but this was a minority view. Existing sexual harassment law frequently does cover some instances of gender harassment, but it is often viewed as less severe than other types of sexual harassment in a legal context. However, psychologists continue to emphasize the study of gender harassment because it is by far the most common type of harassment and has major negative consequences both for the individuals faced with it and the groups who are exposed to repeated gender harassment.

== Aspects ==
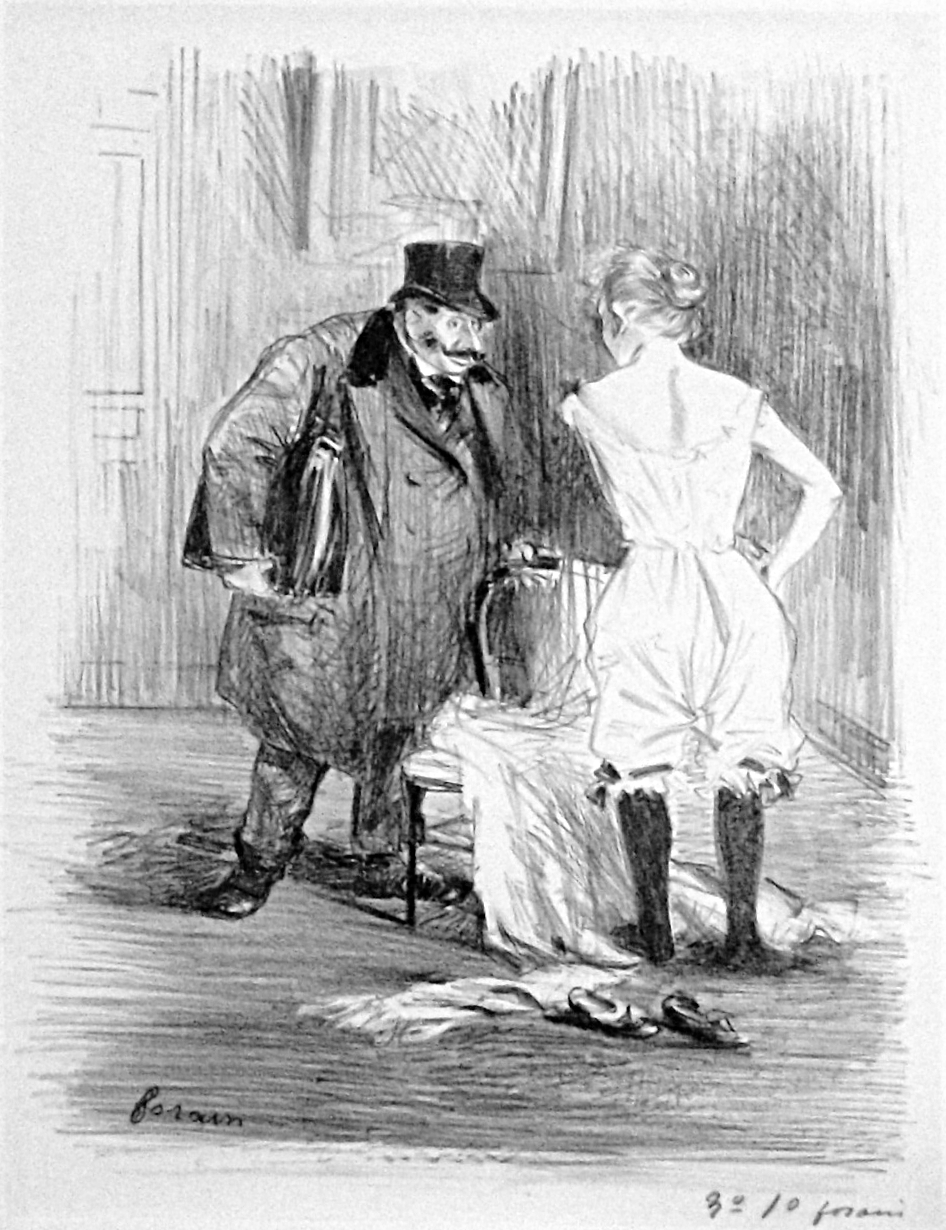
Quid pro quo exchange illustrated in a lithograph created around 1912 called "Executing a writ: so like this I don't owe any rent?"

There is no universal definition of sexual harassment: understandings of it vary across legal, scientific, and cultural settings. Social scientists define sexual harassment by the type of behavior involved and its effect on victims. By these definitions, sexual harassment includes hostile sexist acts (gender harassment), unwanted sexual attention, and sexual coercion. Legal definitions of workplace sexual harassment tend to classify it into quid pro quo demands for sexual favors in exchange for job impacts, or offensive conduct that creates a hostile environment. Laws differ on whether both are considered illegal sexual harassment and whether sexual harassment includes only sexually-related harassment or also harassment based on gender.

Sexual harassment also includes other types, examples can be making sexual comments or jokes, touching someone without their consent, indecent exposure and sending unwanted messages. Actions like this can make people feel uncomfortable or even disrespected. Because of things like this, a lot of workplaces have created policies to prevent sexual harassment and also to help people report it.

=== Labeling as sexual harassment ===
One of the difficulties in understanding sexual harassment is that it involves a range of behaviors. In most cases (although not in all cases), it is difficult for the victim to describe what they experienced. This can be related to difficulty classifying the situation, or to stress and humiliation experienced by the recipient. Moreover, behavior and motives vary between individual cases.

Many instances of sexual harassment are not actually labeled that way by the involved parties. For female victims of experiences that match social science definitions of sexual harassment, victims only self-label the experience as sexual harassment 25% of the time. The rate is even lower for male victims. However, whether victims label an incident as sexual harassment or not, they report the same levels of distress and negative impact. This labeling issue was first discovered after other researchers found that victims of rape are similarly unlikely to label their experience as rape.

Many contextual factors affect how likely people are to label an incident as sexual harassment, and the power dynamics between the perpetrator and victim are a key influence on people's perceptions. People's labeling decisions are also correlated with their gender and relationship to gender roles. During the 1990s and 2000s, women who self-labeled their experiences as sexual harassment were often derided as too sensitive or aiming to make trouble, in addition to being questioned about misinterpreting the harassment, especially if it could be claimed to be unintentional behavior. One 2001 analysis found that women often self-labeled their experiences of unwanted gendered and sexual behavior as "sexism" or the product of a "sexualized environment" rather than sexual harassment.

In some cases visible cleavage have been labeled as sexual harassment.

=== Types of sexual harassment ===
Scientists commonly classify types of sexual harassment via Fitzgerald's Tripartite Model of Sexual Harassment, which has been validated across gender, ethnicity, nation, and industry. The model divides sexual harassment into gender harassment, unwanted sexual attention, and sexual coercion.

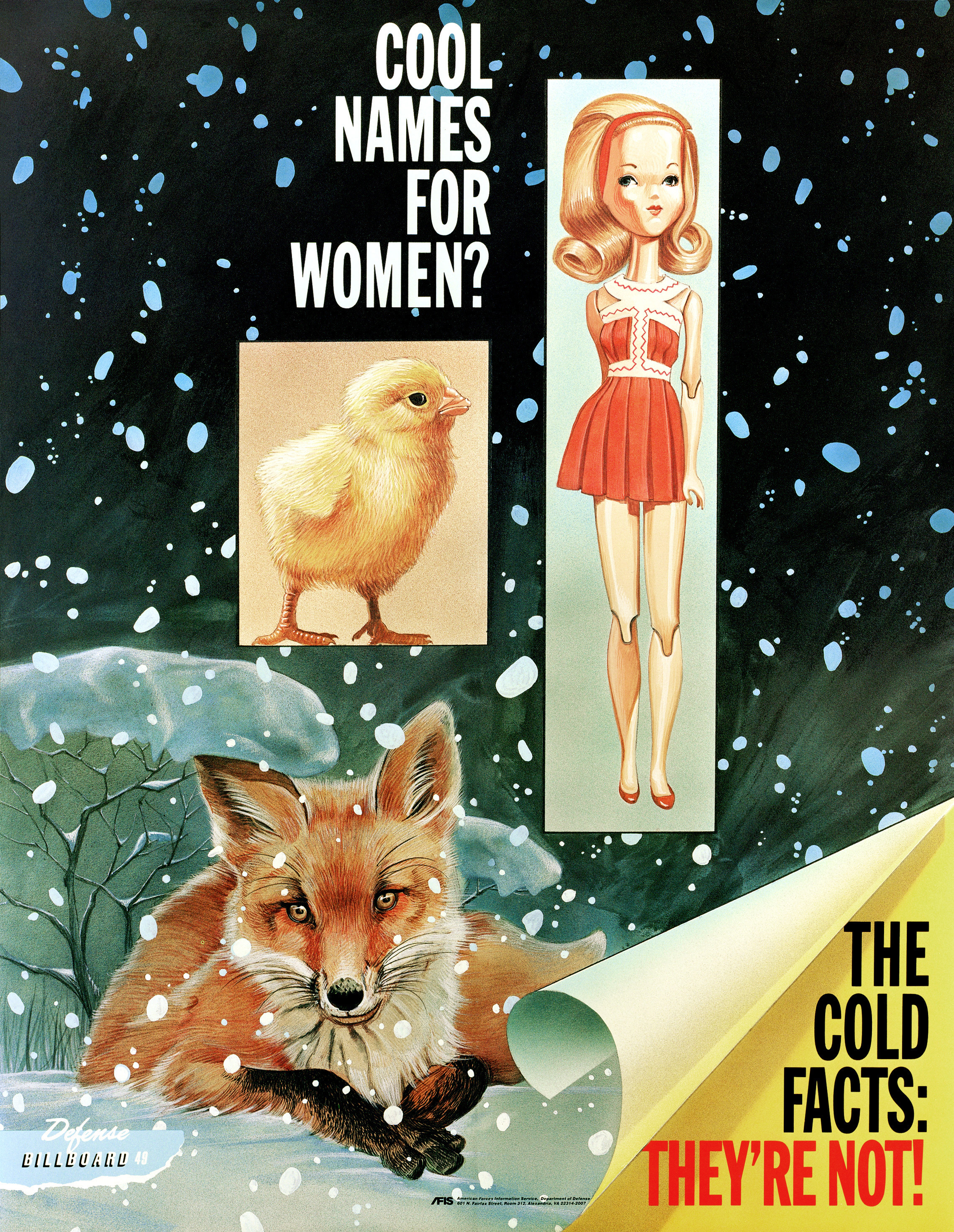
Poster against calling women sexualized names as part of an anti-sexual harassment campaign by AFIS in 2000.

Gender harassment includes insults based on gender stereotypes, sexual slurs or imagery, and other degrading or hostile communications that aim to "put people down and push them out" due to their sex. There are two types of gender harassment: sexist hostility, like insulting gendered jokes, insults based on gender stereotypes, or even sabotage; and crude harassment, which includes gendered slurs and sexualized insults. In contrast, unwanted sexual attention refers to unwelcome sexual advances, like inappropriately talking about sex, pestering someone for sexual or romantic purposes, non-consensual physical touch, and, in extreme cases, sexual assault. Sexual coercion includes explicit and implicit attempts to bribe or threaten someone into sexual cooperation.

Gender harassment is by far the most common type of sexual harassment, and coercion is the rarest. Still, popular awareness of harassment is the opposite, making it harder to identify and understand sexual harassment. Psychology researcher Lilia Cortina developed an iceberg model to describe the many behaviors of sexual harassment, showing how sexual coercion and unwanted sexual attention are the small set of harassment behaviors easily viewable on the surface, but the vast majority of sexual harassment types lie underneath the surface in the category of gender harassment.

=== Intersectional forms of sexual harassment ===
When women of color are sexually harassed, it often includes racial harassment, and when non-straight women are harassed, it often is a combination of sexual and heterosexist harassment. Both populations experience much greater harassment than people with only one of their intersecting identities. Racialized sexual harassment may involve sexual remarks that also bring up race, pet names with racial histories, or even explicitly racialized nicknames. All of these may be built off of existing stereotypes that combine race and gender.

When men sexually harass men, it tends to take the form of gender harassment for the purpose of punishing their targets for deviating from traditional male gender roles. The harasser may see their victim as not fulfilling traditional masculinity values, whether they are gay, young, or inexperienced. Women harassing men is reported less frequently than men harassing women.

==== Women of color ====
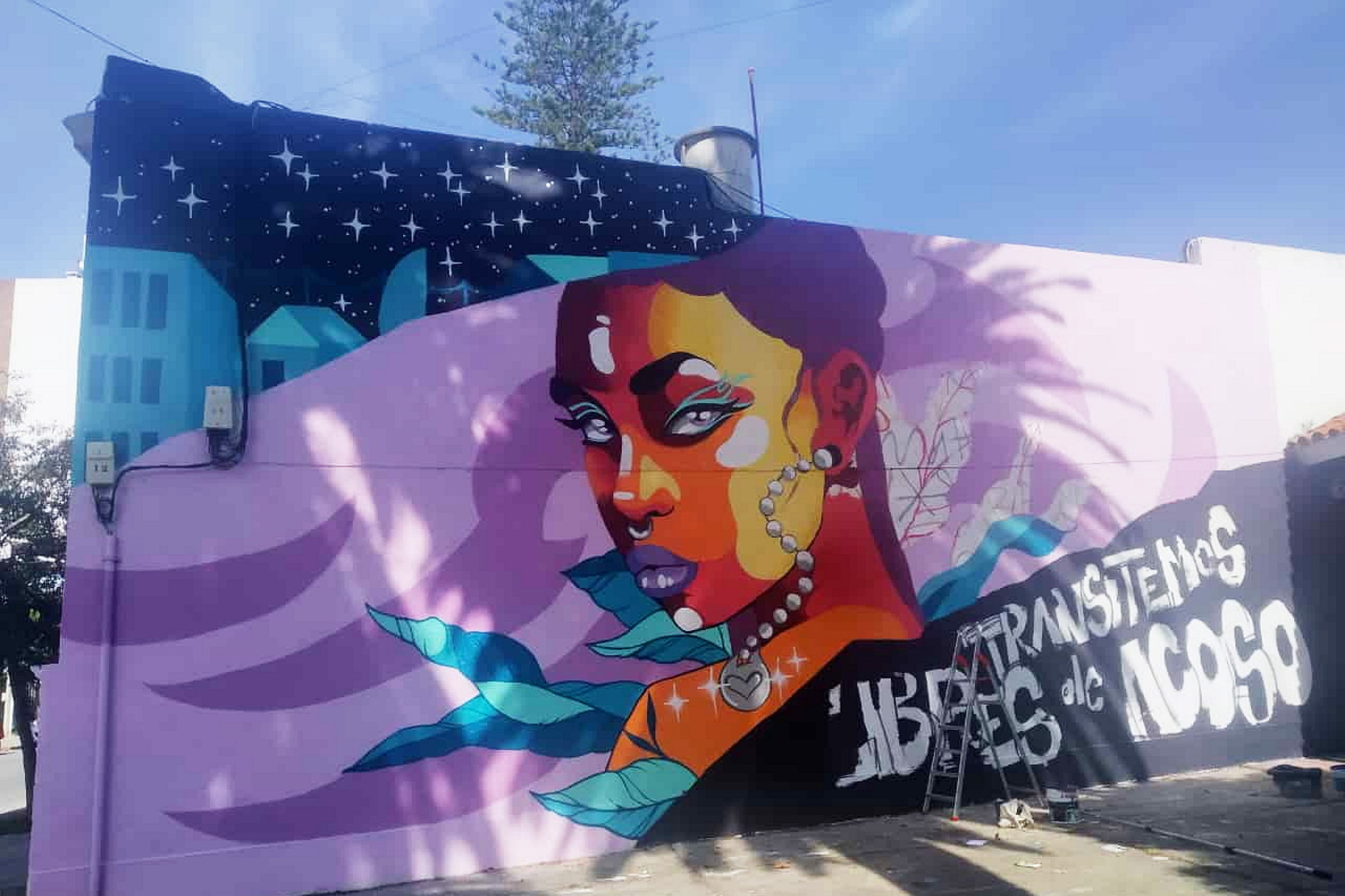
Mural painted for the "Montevideo free of harassment" campaign.

The sexual harassment women of color face is often ignored when discussions about the sexual harassment women face occur. Harassment of women of color tends to stem from racial discrimination. Poor African American women are more likely to experience sexual harassment but less likely to be seen as a victim. Conditions like these make it difficult for women of color to report sexual harassment, allowing the cycle to continue. Earlier studies revealed that there was no difference between the sexual harassment rates of white women and women of color. However, evidence suggests that women of color experience sexual harassment on more severe terms.

Race and gender influence most of the sexual harassment that women of color face. Women of color are less likely to report sexual harassment if the perpetrator is of the same race. This is known as the code of silence. The race of the harasser influences this and predominantly affects women of color. Black women do not usually see things that a white woman would claim to be sexual harassment because they are accustomed to it, it is normal to them and so there is not much of a problem.

Something unique to the sexual harassment of women of color is the common bond factor. The common bond factor is when a man of color sees someone of their own race or culture, and they feel as if it is okay to harass them sexually. They think they can act and speak without regard for the law because they feel it is not being broken.

The perception of sexual harassment from women of color includes racism and sexism, whereas white women's perception only includes sexism. There is this interlocking of relations, commonly known as intersectionality, within the sexual harassment women of color face, between racism and sexism. White women, when speaking about sexual harassment, speak from the role of a victim, whereas women of color speak from the role of a harasser. Women of color, as well, have stereotypes taken into consideration when it comes to harassment. These stereotypes make it difficult for women of color to come forward about sexual harassment, as they will likely not be believed. For instance, there is the stereotype that Latin women are super emotional and tend to overreact. This stereotype may be conveyed when a Latina woman comes forward about sexual harassment, resulting in her claim not being taken seriously. Speaking up results in stereotypes being put on the person coming forward, making them uncomfortable with doing so. Similarly, it is difficult for women of color to be supported when speaking out, as their experiences are different from those of white women, as is the case with Anita Hill. Particularly, the feminist movement is geared towards helping white women rather than women of color due to women of color's experiences being foreign. In turn, women of color do not join feminist movements or groups because they do not see their experiences reflected.

There is a relationship between legal status and sexual harassment; there is an intersectionality between them. Citizen status can influence women experiencing or reporting sexual harassment. Being undocumented can make it difficult to come forward for fear of being deported. White women with citizenship say that sexual harassment is unwanted behavior, women of color without citizenship found it difficult to explain what they thought sexual harassment was, but that it did include race. This, however, makes it difficult for Black women to differentiate sexual harassment in the workplace from sexual harassment in society.

=== Motivations for sexual harassment ===
Author Martha Langelan describes four different classes of harassers.

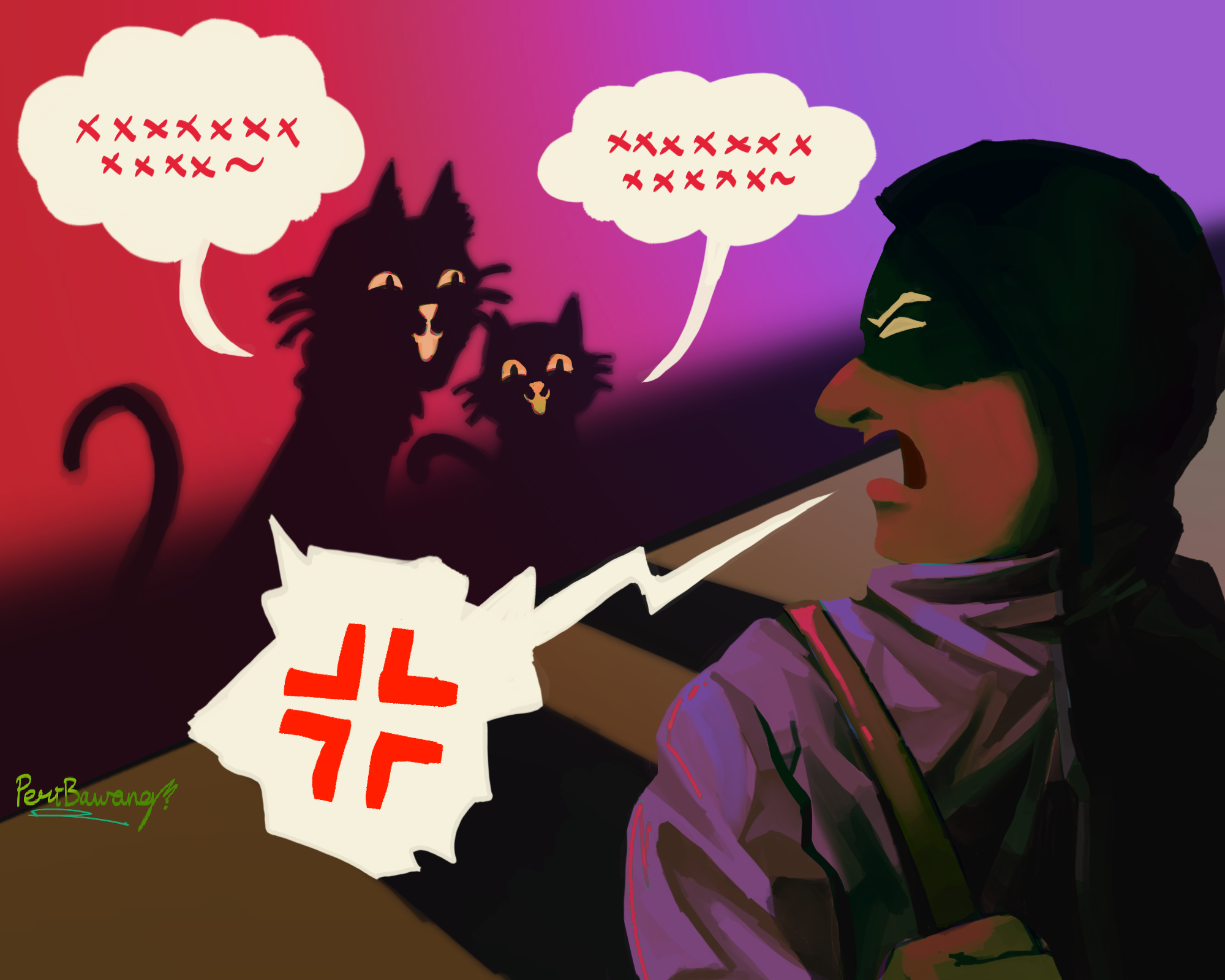
Portrayal of catcalling, a common form of street harassment.

- A predatory harasser: a person who gets sexual thrills from humiliating others. This harasser may become involved in sexual extortion and may frequently harass just to see how targets respond. Those who do not resist may even become targets for rape.
- A dominance harasser: the most common type, who engages in harassing behavior as an ego boost.
- Strategic or territorial harassers who seek to maintain privilege in jobs or physical locations, for example, a man's harassment of a female employee in a predominantly male occupation.
- A street harasser: Another type of sexual harassment performed in public places by strangers. Street harassment includes verbal and nonverbal behavior, remarks that are frequently sexual in nature, and comments on physical appearance or a person's presence in public.

The perpetrators of sexual harassment are more likely to be male than female. In one 2018 survey of U.S. federal workers who were asked to recall the most distressing times they had been sexually harassed, 82% of the harassers were men. Researchers theorize that men are more likely to sexually harass because it is an expression of power that strengthens the harasser's gender-based social status. Because today's societies empower men over people of other genders, sexual harassment is most effective at reinforcing the social privileges of men.

This power-based theory of harassment also explains why sexual harassment often targets and punishes people for deviating from traditional gender roles. People are more likely to sexually harass when they hold hostile, sexist beliefs and believe in the gender binary, thinking that men and women should stay in certain proper roles. However, whether they actually harass others strongly depends on the situation: organizations that tolerate or do not care about harassment, and places that prioritize men by numbers or leadership are very likely to have sexual harassment occur.

Sexual harassment's usefulness in reinforcing power and gender roles shapes how it occurs. Even when harassment seems to express a harasser's sexual desire, it is often motivated by the desire to punish someone for not conforming to gender roles or to devalue women due to their gender. Harassment is often ambient: not targeted at an individual but public or pervasive within a setting, affecting many bystanders. Even targeted harassment can affect other observers when it occurs publicly.

== Situations ==
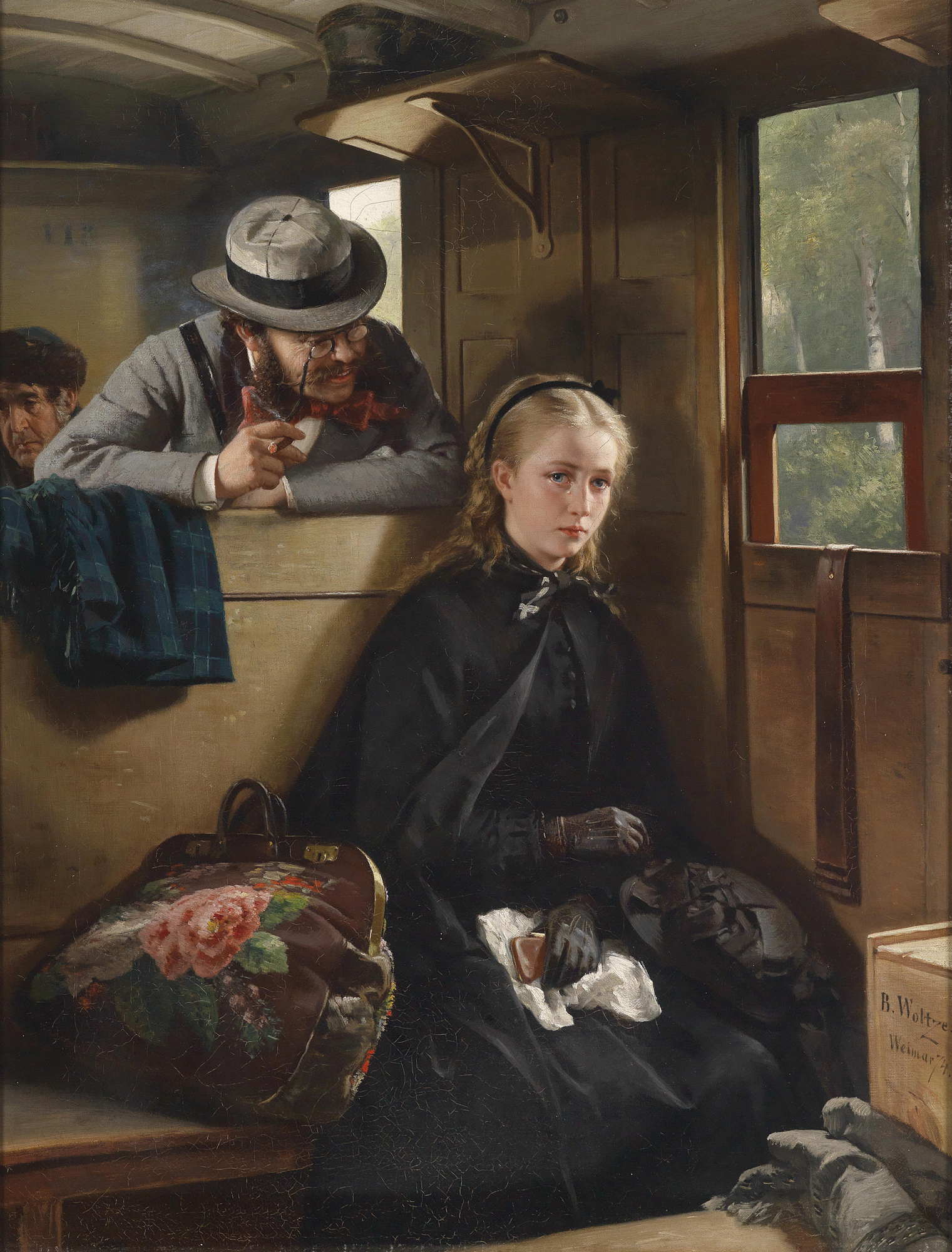
1874 painting by B. Woltze Weimar portraying a man sexually harassing a woman in mourning on a train.

Sexual harassment may occur in a variety of circumstances and in places as varied as factories, schools, colleges, the theater, and the music business. Often, the perpetrator has or is about to have power or authority over the victim (owing to differences in social, political, educational or employment relationships as well as in age). Harassment relationships are specified in many ways:

- The perpetrator can be anyone, such as a client, a partner, a co-worker, a parent or legal guardian, a relative, a teacher or professor, a student, a friend, or a stranger.
- Harassment can occur in varying locations, in schools, colleges, workplaces, in public, and in other places.
- Harassment can occur whether or not there are witnesses to it.
- The perpetrator may be completely unaware that their behavior is offensive or constitutes sexual harassment. The perpetrator may be completely unaware that their actions could be unlawful.
- Incidents of harassment can take place in situations in which the targeted person may not be aware of or understand what is happening.
- An incident may be a one-time occurrence.
- Adverse effects on harassed persons include stress, social withdrawal, sleep disorders, eating difficulties, and other impairments of health.
- The victim and perpetrator can be any gender.
- The incident may arise from a misunderstanding by the perpetrator and/or the victim. These misunderstandings can be reasonable or unreasonable.
- The perpetrator may be motivated by many things, including wanting to belittle, embarrass, or intimidate the victim because of their sex, or in wanting to express sexual desire

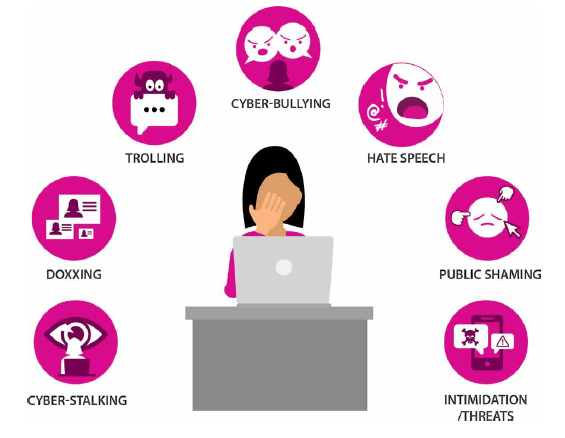
Examples of online harassment commonly experienced by women journalists, who face higher levels of harassment, in more gendered and sexual forms, than men in those roles.

With the advent of the internet, social interactions, including sexual harassment, increasingly occur online, for example, in video games or in chat rooms.

According to the 2014 PEW research statistics on online harassment, 25% of women and 13% of men between the ages of 18 and 24 have experienced sexual harassment while online.

=== In the workplace ===
The United States' Equal Employment Opportunity Commission (EEOC) defines workplace sexual harassment as harassment based on a victim's sex, including "offensive remarks about a person's sex" or "unwelcome sexual advances, requests for sexual favors, and other verbal or physical conduct of a sexual nature". Harassment is illegal "when this conduct explicitly or implicitly affects an individual's employment, unreasonably interferes with an individual's work performance, or creates an intimidating, hostile, or offensive work environment". "The challenged conduct must be unwelcome in the sense that the employee did not solicit or incite it, and in the sense that the employee regarded the conduct as undesirable or offensive." "Particularly when the alleged harasser may have some reason (e.g., prior consensual relationship) to believe that the advances will be welcomed, it is important for the victim to communicate that the conduct is unwelcome."

Surveys vary widely in determining how frequently sexual harassment occurs in workplaces. A well-regarded 2003 meta-survey concluded that about 58% of women have been sexually harassed at work. Another survey concluded that 13% of male employees have been harassed at work. In a 2024 study, 42% of transgender employees reported having been sexually harassed at work. Women made 78.2% of the workplace sexual harassment complaints filed with the EEOC from 2018 to 2021. Only about 30% of workplace sexual harassment victims tell their supervisor or union representative about the harassment. Only 6–13% ever file a formal complaint. Managers often relabel sexual harassment claims as mere interpersonal disagreements, and retaliation is common. Thus, 43.5% of EEOC sexual harassment complaints included retaliation complaints in 2018–2021. A survey of harassment case plaintiffs found that 24% had been fired for complaining of harassment, and another 42% had resigned due to the harassment.

Most workplace sexual harassment is perpetrated by coworkers or peers rather than managers. Workplace culture is one of the strongest determining factors for sexual harassment: sexual harassment is more likely in fields that are seen as traditionally masculine, or companies where men outnumber women, or leadership is dominated by men. Organizational tolerance of harassment, sexism, or alcohol use, and institutions with strong power hierarchies, also increase the likelihood of harassment. Based on data from the EEOC, the industries with the most sexual harassment reports between 2005 and 2015 were restaurant and hospitality, health care, academia, and the military. Sources of harassment vary widely by industry. For nurses, 58% have been harassed by a patient, 26% by a colleague, and 19% by a patient's acquaintances. In the U.S. military, 60% of sexual harassment is caused by a supervisor. For restaurant industry employees, around 66% of women and 50% of men have been sexually harassed by management, and around 80% of women and 55% of men have been sexually harassed by customers.

Most sexual harassment at work takes the form of gender harassment. A far smaller number of harassment victims report experiencing sexual coercion at work: this was about 4% of women surveyed across factory settings and academia in 1997. Workplace sexual harassment is frequently repeated, with less than a third of victims describing harassment as a one-time occurrence, and many stating it had lasted for weeks to months. Whether sexual harassment incidents include physical harassment usually depends on the industry: around 50% of sexual harassment complaints by blue-collar workers included a physical component, compared to 32% of complaints by managers. A study of harassment cases in 1986-1995 found that more than half of the instances of workplace harassment occurred entirely outside the workplace, with a third involving letters, phone calls, or visits to the victim's home.

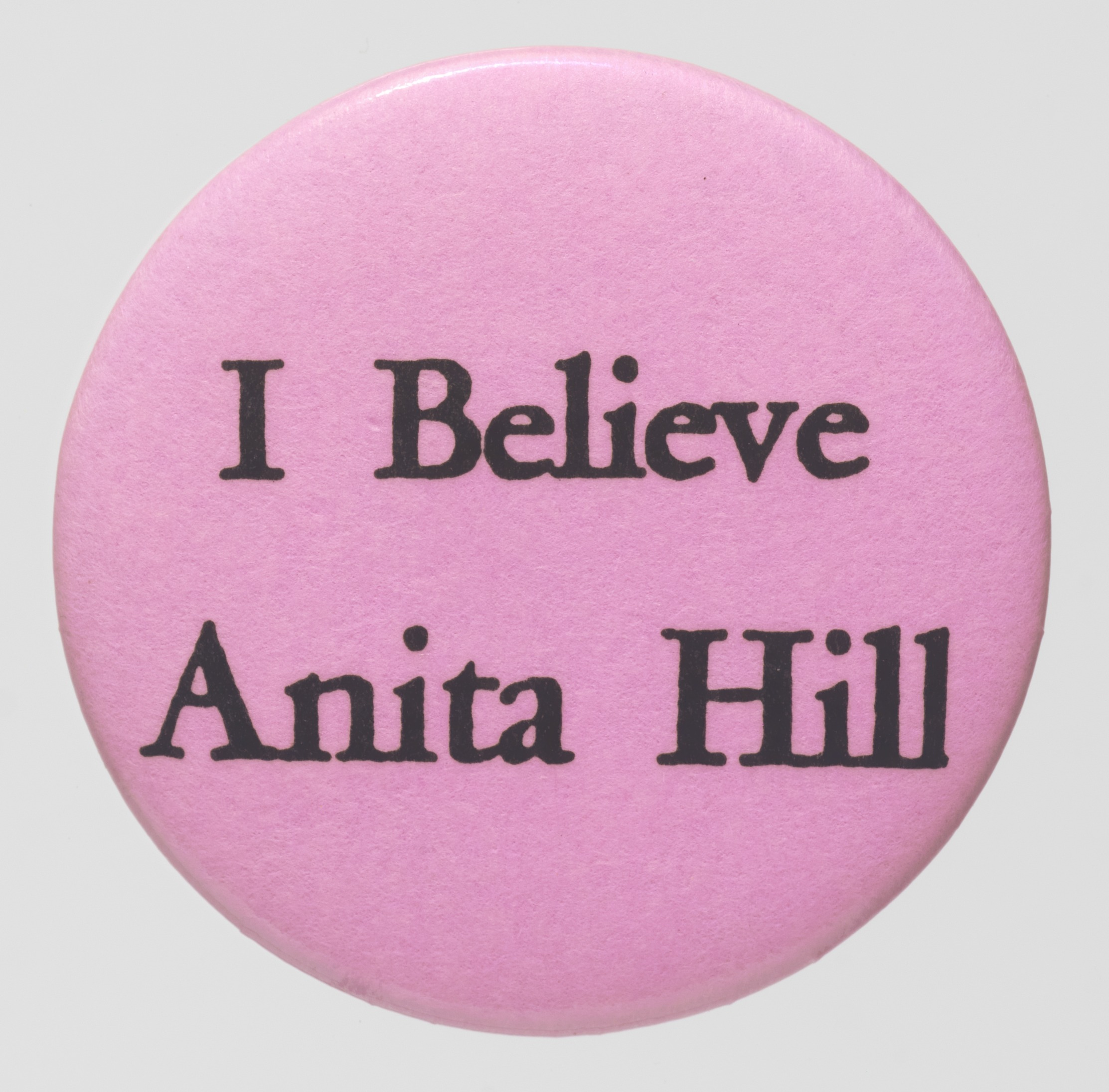
An "I Believe Anita Hill" pin in support of Anita Hill's 1991 testimony to the Senate Judiciary Committee, where she accused U.S. Supreme Court nominee Clarence Thomas of sexual harassment

In 1991, Anita Hill witnessed and testified to the Senate Judiciary Committee against Supreme Court of the United States nominee Clarence Thomas, citing sexual harassment. Hill said on 11 October 1991, in televised hearings that Thomas had sexually harassed her while he was her supervisor at the Department of Education and the EEOC. According to Hill, Thomas asked her out socially many times during her two years of employment as his assistant, and after she declined his requests, he used work situations to discuss sexual subjects and push advances. Since Hill testified in 1991, the term sexual harassment became known outside academic and legal circles; the number of cases reported in the United States and Canada increased markedly, climbing steadily since. Sexual harassment is discussed a lot in modern society. People are becoming more and more concerned about the laws of sexual harassment therein. Many school groups are focusing on this matter.

In 1994, Paula Jones, a civil servant and former Arkansas state employee, sued President Bill Clinton for sexual harassment. In the initial lawsuit, Jones cited Clinton for sexual harassment at a hotel in 1991. Following a series of civil suits and appeals, the case was settled in 1998. President Clinton reached an out-of-court settlement with Jones, agreeing to pay her $850,000 but acknowledging no wrongdoing.

==== Sexual bribery ====
A sexual bribe is the solicitation of sex, any sexual activity, or other sex-linked behavior for a promise of elevation in work status or pay. It is in an employment setting in which a sexual relationship with an employer or superior is made an explicit or implied condition for obtaining or retaining employment or its benefits. A sexual bribe may be either overt or subtle but falls under the type of quid pro quo sexual harassment.

==== Girl watching ====
Girl watching is considered a game amongst men in which they sexually evaluate women. This game is a form of sexual harassment, one that is very common in the workplace. This game, just like other forms of sexual harassment are not the actions of an individual outside of the norm, but rather of those within it. An analysis of sexual harassment surveys, conducted by Ilies, revealed that when the question regarding sexual harassment was phrased 'if women had ever experienced sexual harassment' then the frequency of women's responses was 24%, whereas if women were asked 'if they had experienced sexually harassing behaviors' then the frequency was 58%.

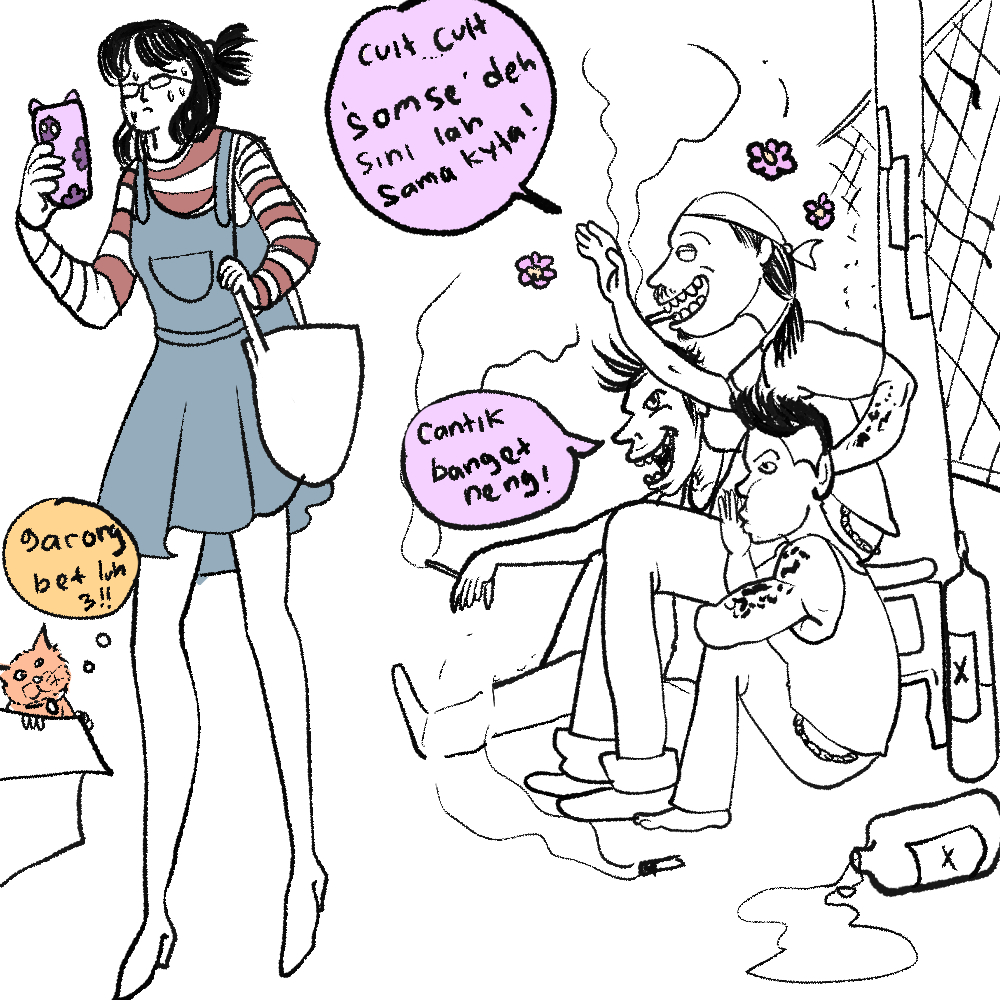
Indonesian illustration of a group of men catcalling a woman.

Beth Quinn (2002), the author of "Sexual Harassment and Masculinity: The Power and Meaning of 'Girl Watching'" originally was not researching girl watching when she stumbled upon the game, however, Quinn (2002) stated that her work was more exploratory than confirmatory, explaining why she continued exploring the idea of Girl Watching. At first, Quinn was researching the difference between what women and men see as sexual harassment. It was through the interviews (43) that she conducted that she noticed an occurrence of the game in her interviews with men. In addition to conducting interviews, Quinn (2002) observed the participants and gathered additional information about the game. She learned that men, usually when in a group, will watch the women around them and make comments towards them.

Quinn (2002) found that men saw no problem with this and viewed it as a game that did no harm to women. According to Quinn, men can excuse sexual harassment because it is not seen as such to them; men see it as a 'game' or 'playing'. Men, as well, use humor to harass women sexually. Through humor, men can make crude remarks, and if caught, can claim that it was only a joke and that women need to loosen up. This results in the continuation of sexual harassment against women. Through instances like these, men sexually harassing women or their advances are encouraged, in turn forcing women to reject men politely, only resulting in more sexual advances from men. Through Quinn (2002) asking men to imagine themselves as women, they unintentionally revealed the harm it causes women. The men began to claim they would make sure to dress appropriately and in ways that would not draw the attention of other men, so they would not be targeted. It was this information that revealed the harm Girl Watching caused to women. Quinn continued to learn more about men's feelings towards the game and its effect on women through her interviews. Quinn learned that it was fun for men until they got caught. If a woman looked towards the group watching her during their remarks or said something to them, it would make things awkward and no longer be the fun game they were playing. This is because men were looking at women as objects, and as soon as the women made notice of them or they got caught, they would become a subject objecting, ruining their game because she was no longer an object for their enjoyment. Women are seen as objects, with no feelings or thoughts, not as subjects.

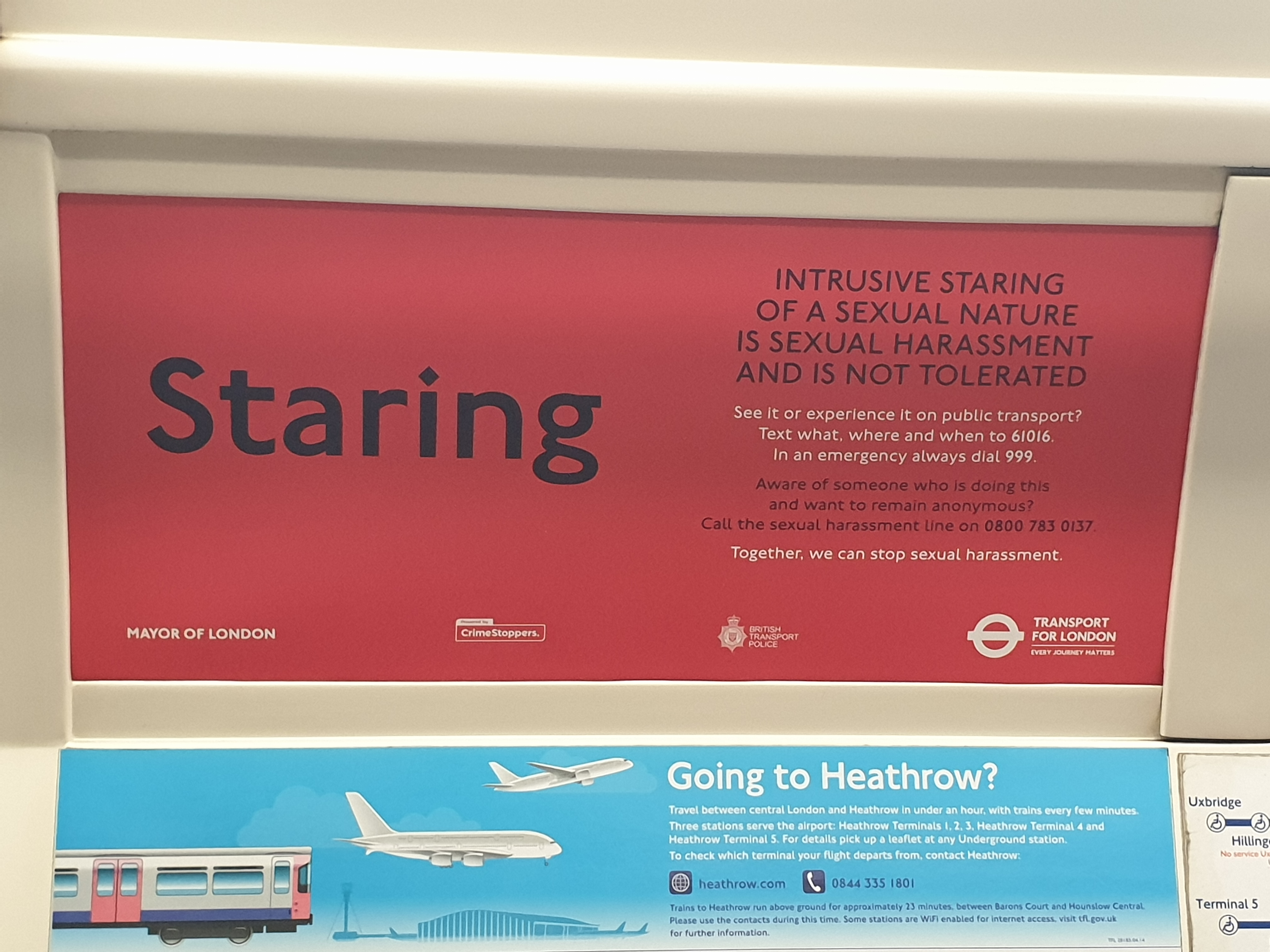
London public service advertisement stating that intrusive, sexual staring is sexual harassment.

This sexual harassment does not occur merely because of men's attraction to women, but rather as a power move. Similar to most cases of sexual harassment, men tend to harass as a way of staying in power. When men feel threatened, they will resort to sexual harassment as a way of maintaining their power. Men also harass as a way of maintaining their masculinity, especially when they feel it is threatened. When some men feel that their masculinity or their gender are threatened, they may resort to sexual harassment as a means of reinforcing their dominance and assuring themselves of their identity. Along with this, when men felt threatened, the likelihood of their participation in sexual harassing behaviors increased. There is an unequal power balance between men and women, and this is a result of sexual harassment. This power balance, being unequal, is partly rooted in the sexual harassment of women by men with a view to the perpetuation of the latter's power.

=== In the military ===
Studies of sexual harassment have found that it is markedly more common in the military than in civilian settings. In 2018, an estimated 20,500 people in the US armed forces (about 13,000 women and 7,500 men) were assaulted, up from 14,900 in 2016. A Canadian study found that key risk factors associated with military settings are the typically young age of personnel, the 'isolated and integrated' nature of accommodation, the minority status of women, and the disproportionate number of men in senior positions. The traditionally masculine values and behaviors that are rewarded and reinforced in military settings, as well as their emphasis on conformity and obedience, are also thought to play a role. Canadian research has also found that the risk increases during deployment on military operations.

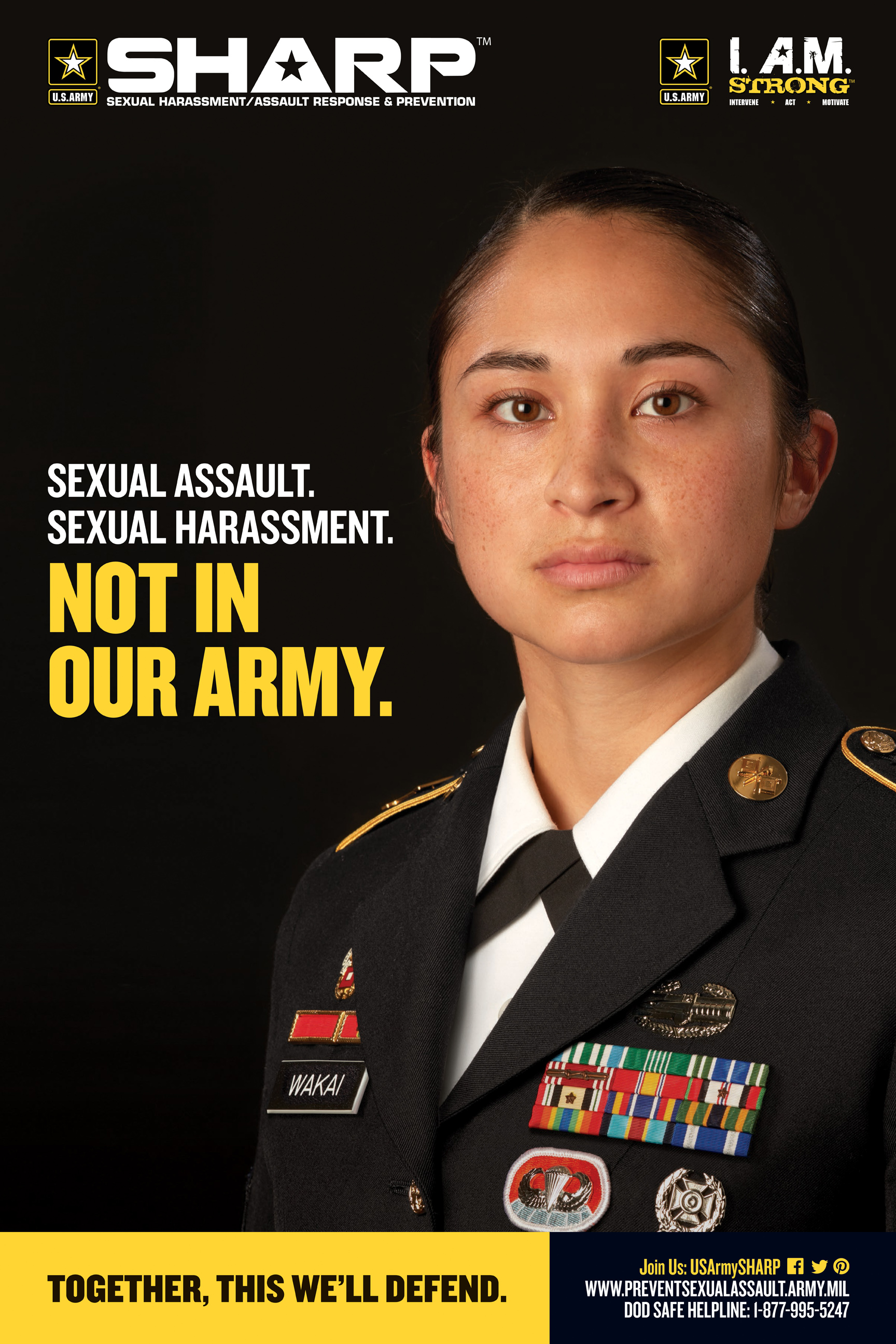
Poster created by the U.S. Army's Sexual Harassment/Assault Response & Prevention (SHARP)

While some male military personnel are sexually harassed, women are substantially more likely to be affected. Women who are younger and joined the military at a younger age face a greater risk, according to American, British and French research.

Child recruits (under 18) and children in cadet forces also face an elevated risk. In the UK, for example, hundreds of complaints of the sexual abuse of cadets have been recorded since 2012. In Canada, 10% of complaints of sexual assault in military settings are from child cadets or their parents.

Individuals detained by the military are also vulnerable to sexual harassment. During the Iraq War, for example, personnel of the US army and US Central Intelligence Agency committed many human rights violations against detainees in the Abu Ghraib prison, including rape, sodomy, and other forms of sexual abuse.

Although the risk of sexual misconduct in the armed forces is widely acknowledged, personnel are frequently reluctant to report incidents, typically out of fear of reprisals, according to research in Australia, Canada, France, the UK, and the US.

Women affected by sexual harassment are more likely than other women to suffer stress-related mental illness afterward. Research in the US found that when sexual abuse of female military personnel is psychiatrically traumatic, the odds of suffering from post-traumatic stress disorder (PTSD) after deployment on operations increase by a factor of nine.

=== In education ===
On 16 April 2026, 16 Faculty of Law students of the University of Indonesia were suspended pending investigation after messages containing explicit remarks about female peers circulated online and prompted public criticism.

== Measurement ==
=== Research design ===
==== Sampling techniques ====
Sampling techniques are important to all types of research. Sampling matters because it affects the generalizability of the results and how they can be used to better understand sexual harassment. Two sampling methods are probability sampling and non-probability sampling, each with distinct strengths and weaknesses for the study.

Probability sampling involves taking a sample from a subset of the population using random selection. The random selection used in probability sampling is key to making the results generalizable to the population that is being studied, which makes it more widely used than other nonrandom methods. Although the use of probability sampling has its perks, the data may not be representative or generalizable because the research is limited to certain contexts/environments. Sampling only people in a particular environment makes the results applicable only to that environment. For example, the results from a study of sexual harassment done in an office space in China cannot apply to the occurrence of sexual harassment at an American university. Similarly, if the sample being used is too small, it cannot be generalized to the larger population.

Despite its potential for bias, non-probability sampling may be used when research lacks funding or the number of available participants is small. The selection of participants in non-probability sampling is nonrandom and is often the most convenient. Many of the early studies of sexual harassment, such as the survey by the Working Women's Institute (1975) and the Redbook Survey, have relied on convenience or non-probability sampling. The sampling was often done at conventions, meetings, or sent out in letters or magazines.

===== Importance of wording =====
In every study measuring sexual harassment, the wording of questions, introductions, definitions, and other parts of the survey or interview can affect responses. Language can be used in many ways to get certain responses from the participants.

Work done by Psychologist Mary Koss describes a problem in wording used to ask participants about sexual violence and how this can impact the results and assumptions of prevalence. Koss explained the problem with other estimation methods was that the prevalence of sexual violence was skewed because the beliefs of the people being asked were that nonconsensual heterosexual sex was normative. Many sociologists believe that heterosexual relationships often involve nonconsensual sex that has been normalized because of the roles men and women fill in society. Men are dominant and aggressive, and women submit to their advances. This normality around nonconsensual heterosexual sex causes the spread of rape myths and the misrepresentation of rape prevalence in society. To combat this bias, Koss created a new instrument that used neutral wording in her questions to dig deeper into their experiences with nonconsensual sex. She focused on women college students and found the prevalence of rape was much higher than was being reported. Koss' work highlighted the importance of wording in surveys and received considerable attention, both positive and negative.

=== History ===
Past measurement methods relied on simple checklists of what was considered sexual harassment, but these lacked reliability and validity, which made results invalid and non-generalizable. These past methods left many unanswered questions on how to measure sexual harassment in the best way.

The first attempt at creating a way to classify and measure sexual harassment was made in 1980. Before there was a legal framework to follow, Till (1980) created a system based on a sample of college women that classified different sexual harassment behaviors into five categories: Gender harassment, seductive behavior, sexual bribery, sexual coercion, sexual imposition, or assault.

Later in 1992, Gruber created another classification system that included 11 specific types of harassment organized into three categories in decreasing order of severity. The three categories were verbal requests, verbal remarks, and nonverbal displays.

==== Early surveys ====
These early surveys lacked scientific methods of sampling, but they clearly demonstrated the prevalence of sexual harassment and were cited to prove the importance of sexual harassment as a social issue.

===== Working Women's United (WWU) =====
Working Women's United (WWU) created one of the first studies to measure sexual harassment. The survey was given out during a speak-out event designed to ask women about their experiences with sexual harassment. 155 women responded to the survey, and 7 out of 10 experienced sexual harassment. The respondents' occupations ranged from teacher to factory worker. This helped them conclude that sexual harassment was happening in all workplaces. Although this survey was not scientific, it was the first of its kind and inspired many other organizations and researchers to conduct their own studies.

===== Working Office Workers (WOW) =====
Women Office Workers (WOW) created a 1975 survey that asked 15,000 women about their experiences and feelings in the workplace, including the prevalence of sexual harassment. 1/3 of the respondents reported that they had experienced "direct sexual harassment".

===== Redbook Survey =====
In 1975, the Redbook Survey was created and was used to survey women on a naval base on their experiences with sexual harassment. A survey included in an issue of Redbook magazine gathered data from 9,000 respondents. 81% of respondents reported they had experienced sexual harassment. This survey was then used again in other environments to test the prevalence of sexual harassment, proving its high external validity.

===== US Merit System Protection Board (USMSPB) =====
From 1981 to 1987, the US Merit System Protection Board (USMSPB) developed another classification system and data-collection method. The Office of Merit Systems Review and Studies (MSPBs) created this scientific survey to measure sexual harassment in the federal workplace in response to the many questions people were posing about workplace sexual harassment. The survey was created after reviewing past research, cases of sexual harassment, and working with community members, academic researchers, and federal officials. After revisions and testing, the final survey was created. They tested the survey on a stratified random sample from employees in the executive branch from different sexes, minorities, salaries, and organizations. The survey was conducted from May 1978 to May 1980. In this model, seven harassing behaviors were classified into three levels of severity: less severe, moderately severe, and most severe. Examples of these levels were: less severe: unwelcome sexual remarks, suggestive looks and gestures, and deliberate touching, moderately severe: pressure for dates, pressure for sexual favors, and unwelcome letters and telephone calls, and most severe: actual or attempted rape or sexual assault. This data collection method requires participants to indicate if they have experienced the behavior described. They found that 42% of women and 15% of men had experienced and reported sexual harassment in the workplace. They also received more detailed information on who was more likely to report/experience sexual harassment and what types of harassment were taking place. They also observed the consequences of harassment, which were mostly reported as victims leaving their jobs. Overall, concluded that harassment is widespread, has negative consequences, and impacts a variety of victims. This method has been critiqued for ignoring the need for reliability and validity in its measures.

===== Uniform Crime Report (UCR) =====
The Uniform Crime Report (UCR) served as the basis for reaching statistics on the prevalence of rape against women in the 1980s. Although this survey was useful, it was often criticized for underestimating the true prevalence of rape. Critics argued that one of the main issues with the UCR was that it relied on reported crimes for its reports of prevalence, but many rapes are not reported or are mishandled, which skews the data.

===== Sexual Experiences Questionnaire (SEQ) =====
Developed by Fitzgerald et al. in 1988, the Sexual Experiences Questionnaire (SEQ) was the first attempt to study the prevalence of sexual harassment in a scientific manner. The SEQ used self-reporting and required participants to respond with the answer that they felt best described their experience. They picked from three options on a scale measure: never, once, and more than once. The scenarios were only listed in behavioral terms, and they did not use the word sexual harassment until the end to avoid confounding variables of self-labeling. The survey yielded frequencies and percentages for use in statistical analyses. The test was retested multiple times and produced reliable and valid results. The SEQ is very widely used in a variety of environments and cultures. The SEQ is often cited as the best measurement instrument available. Example questions included: Have you ever been in a situation where a supervisor or coworker habitually told suggestive stories or offensive jokes?. Despite the high praise for the SEQ, there are also several critiques on its design. For example, the wording of the questions can skew responses, and the scoring method can only produce frequency distributions.

===== SEQ-W (1995) =====
Fitzgerald et al. (1995) created and tested the SEQ-W, an updated version of the SEQ that addressed critiques. Their framework consists of three dimensions: sexual coercion, unwanted sexual attention, and gender harassment. They defined gender harassment as behaviors, both verbal and nonverbal, that project/express violent and insulting feelings about women. Examples of this include gestures, taunts, hazing, threats, sexual slurs, etc. Gender harassment is the most widespread form of harassment, but it is typically ignored because it is not seen as a big issue like other forms of sexual harassment. Sexual coercion includes the exchange of sexual acts/favors for job-related benefits (quid pro quo). This model was tested on different samples of women from a variety of occupations, education levels, and cultures. After testing, the model was found to be structurally valid across different settings and cultures. The model was reported as reliable, efficient, valid, and practical.

===== Sexual Experiences Survey (SES) =====
In an attempt to go beyond the past methods and create a more accurate representation of the occurrence of rape and other sexual victimizations, Koss and colleagues developed a new measurement tool called the Sexual Experiences Survey (SES). The SES included a legal definition of rape, accounted for other experiences of sexual harassment/assault and used graphic language and "behaviorally specific" questions to cue the victims recall.

The SES and its first testing caused a large increase in the research done on rape. Despite its strengths, the SES was critiqued for using broad and "poorly phrased" definitions and questions. They argued that the language used caused women to report that they had experienced a form of sexual harassment but not been raped. These critics concluded that the SES overestimates rape.

In 1992, the SES underwent a redesign and a name change. The now-called National Crime Victimization Survey (NCVS) was built on critiques of the previous survey and developed a brand-new methodological tool.

===== Nationwide Crime Victimization Survey (NCVS) =====
The Nationwide Crime Victimization Survey (NCVS) annually conducts research and reports information about different types of criminal victimization, such as robbery, theft, household burglary, and sexual victimization. The NCVS has been conducted since 1973 and uses the same methods as when it was created which makes it the only source to compare the prevalence of sexual harassment across time.

To investigate this claim of underestimation of rape, the National Research Council held a panel to review and identify the errors within the NCVS. The conclusion from this panel was that the NCVS had several methodological problems that caused this underestimation of rape and sexual assault.

One of the main issues with NCVS was that it used language focused on crime and victimization, which led respondents to answer differently. Whether respondents did not want to label their experiences as rape or if they feared that their perpetrator was going to be punished, the use of language was leading to inaccurate results. Additionally, the NCVS fails to protect the privacy of its participants. The interviewer has to ask one of the questions to everyone 12 and older in a certain house. This causes everyone in that area to be aware of the others' participation and what questions everyone is being asked. This risk of lack of privacy could lead respondents not to answer honestly, or answer in a socially desirable way. Finally, the NCVS has limited definitions of rape that lead to confusion and ambiguity.

=== College sexual harassment surveys ===
==== National College Women Sexual Victimization Survey (NCVS) vs National Violence Against Women Survey (NVAW) ====
Two widely used surveys, the NCVS and the NVAW, can be compared to examine the strengths and weaknesses of each and how these impact their results. The sample for the National College Women Sexual Victimization Survey comprised 233 higher education institutions (194 four-year institutions and 39 two-year institutions) in the United States with 1,000 or more students. The sampling method used was a stratified sampling method to pick institutions, and then a random sample was taken of students. The sample size of students who took the survey was 4,446. The National Violence Against Women Survey used the same sampling method but had slightly different sample numbers. The survey title and the survey description were different. The NCVS named their survey "The Extent and Nature of Sexual Victimization of College Women", and the NVAW named it "Victimization Among College Women".

The methods used were also similar, including the use of professionally trained women interviewers to administer both surveys. The interviews were conducted using a computer-assisted telephone interviewing (CATI) system. The average interview time was longer for the NCVS than the NVAW (25.9 minutes vs 12.7 minutes). They both had similar response rates, but the NVAW had a higher response rate of 91.6% compared to the NCVS rate of 85.6%.

The surveys gave the same introduction to the interview with the same wording:

"As you may recall, the purpose of the study is to better understand the extent and nature of criminal victimization among college women. Regardless of whether or not you have ever personally been victimized, your answers will help us to understand and deal with the problem of victimization at your campus and nationally."

The two surveys used different definitions of completed rape, attempted rape, and threat of rape. The NCVS used a broader definition of completed rape that included other instances other than just penile vaginal penetration, whereas the NVAW used a more objective and narrow definition. Attempted rape and threat of rape were defined by the NVAW more broadly and included the element of psychological coercion as an element of force.

The two surveys first had the women answer questions to determine whether they had experienced victimization; if they had, they would then complete an incident report to describe the nature of the victimization.

The estimates of rape were statistically lower for the NVAW study than the estimates from the NSCVS. The difference in estimation is due to the use of wide definition and behaviorally specific questions used in the NSCVS.

The differences in these methods display the important implications of measurement methods, such as the importance of the wording of questions and language used in introductions or interviews, because this can influence responses.

==== National College Women Sexual Victimization Survey (NCWSV) ====
In an experiment, Bonnie Fisher and colleagues (1996) created the NCWSV to compare question wording and assess how results from the NCVS would compare with those from the NCWSV. The NCWSV questions focused on behavior-specific items rather than on confusing terminology that was not clearly defined. Specifically, the NCVS does not ask about rape occurring when incapacitated (due to drugs or alcohol). The results of this study were shocking because they found that the wording used in the NCVS caught less than 10% of the incidents of rape that the NCWSV did. These results lead to suggestions that the NCVS needed to be reworked or a new survey needed to be created to measure sexual assault accurately.

==== Online College Social Life Survey (OCSLS) ====
The Online College Social Life Survey, used from 2005 to 2011, asked questions about incapacitated and attempted rape. The respondents were asked to answer these questions: "Since you started college, has someone tried to physically force you to have sexual intercourse, but you got out of the situation without having intercourse?" and "Since you started college, has someone had sexual intercourse with you that you did not want when you were drunk, passed out, asleep, drugged, or otherwise incapacitated?". This survey resulted in small estimations of rape. The reason for this underestimation is that they did not ask questions that would include unwanted touching/grabbing or psychological coercion. Other college surveys, such as the Campus Sexual Assault (CSA) survey, created in 2007, had limited samples, only drawing responses from a few universities, making the data inapplicable to most of the female college population.

==== Self Labeling, Latent Class Cluster (LCC), and Behavioral Experiences ====
A study by Nielsen et al. (2010) tested three estimation/measurement methods to investigate their strengths and weaknesses. Current research methods are often criticized for having faulty research design that impacts the validity of the results. The results are often biased due to variations in the operational definitions and the lack of representative samples. The article emphasizes the importance of accurate measurement methods because the conclusions drawn from these studies inform judgments about the prevention and treatment of sexual harassment. The three surveying methods tested were Self-labeling, Latent Class Cluster (LCC) modeling, and behavioral experiences.

- Self Labeling is a good method because it is easy to administer and does not take up a lot of space on the survey. But it does not provide details on the nature of their experiences or how often they occur. Self-labeling is also very subjective because it forces the participant to define sexual harassment themselves, and that definition may differ based on the individual. Finally, self-labeling might make some participants feel threatened to admit that they are victims/label themselves.
- Latent Class Cluster (LCC) is beneficial because it creates several different groups based on the nature and frequency of the respondents' experiences rather than creating just two groups of respondents (harassed or non-harassed). It also shows stronger predictive validity.
- Behavioral experiences is effective because it is more objective and does not make them label their experiences. They suggest that the best measurement method is a combination of the LCC and behavioral experience approach.

==== Bergen Sexual Harassment Scale (BSHS) ====
The Bergen Sexual Harassment Scale (BSHS) consists of two parts. The first part measures exposure to sexual harassment by asking participants to respond to 11 items categorized into different types of sexual harassment: unwanted verbal sexual attention, unwanted physical sexual behaviors, and sexual pressure. The second part asks participants to indicate if they believe they had been exposed to sexual harassment at work in the past. They answered it with (no, yes to a certain extent, or yes to a large extent). Researchers did not define sexual harassment for participants when doing part two.

==== Computer-Based Interaction Model ====
A new measure developed by Maass and colleagues that uses a computer-based model to assess gender harassment through behavior. Male participants are told they are interacting with a female partner through the computer. The researchers sought to determine whether participants would send harassing content or messages to the partner (a computer). They found that men were more likely to harass their partner if the partner threatened the male's standing in the gender hierarchy (for example, if the partner identified as a feminist). That study presents an alternative measure to those used in other studies. That study asks male participants to imagine themselves in scenarios and indicate which behavior they would most likely exhibit. The researchers were attempting to determine whether men were more likely to harass a female coworker if that coworker threatened their masculinity.

== Prevention ==
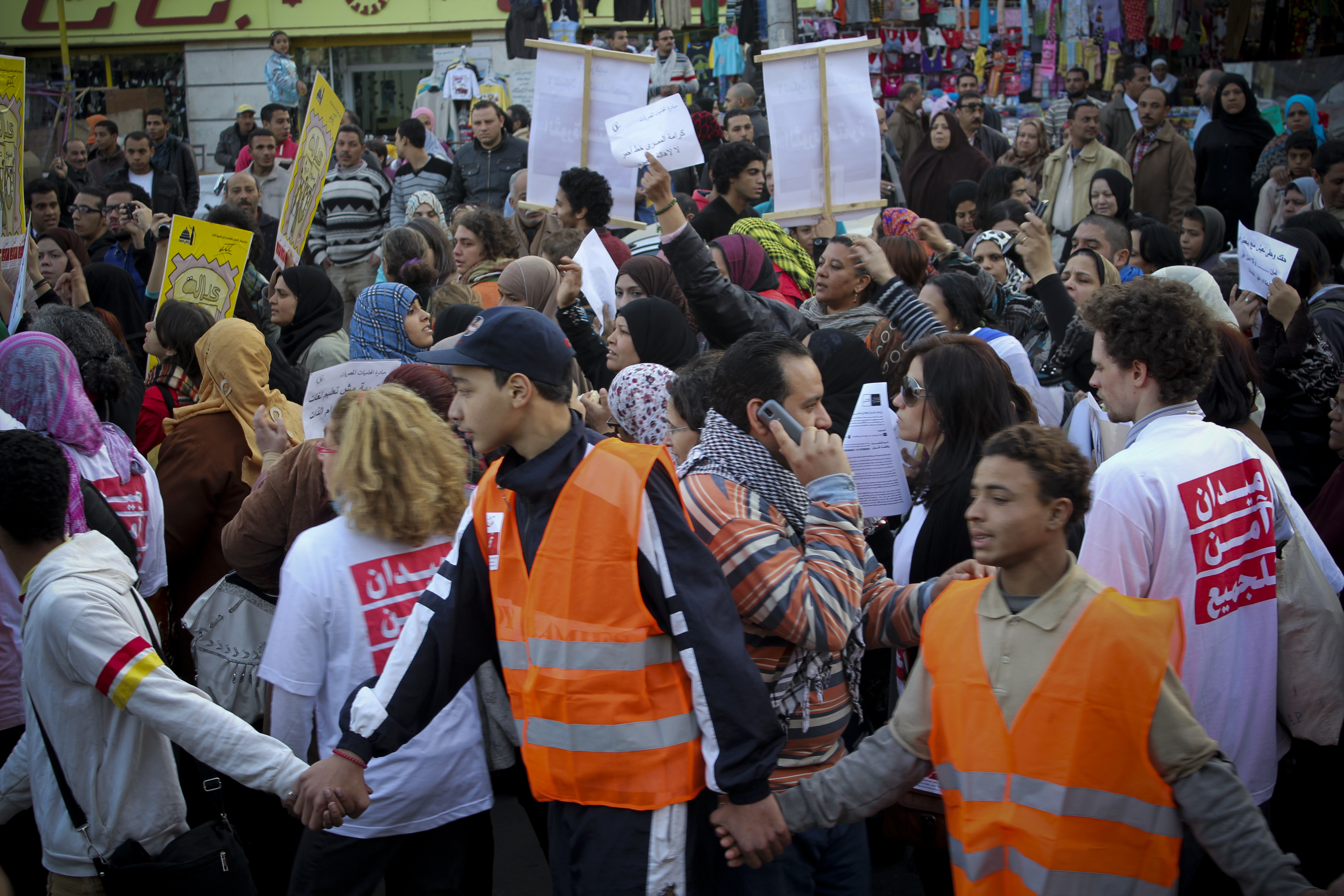
Anti-sexual harassment march to Tahrir Square in Egypt on February 6, 2013.

Sexual harassment is a longstanding and ubiquitous social issue, but it is often normalized, left unacknowledged, and even trivialized. Certain settings make harassment more likely, making it an institutional and societal problem that can be solved by changes at the organizational and cultural level. However, many attempted institutional interventions are not motivated by an understanding of how harassment works, and are instead chosen because they are simple or they fit a legal minimum standard. This has resulted in a wide range of intervention styles and research on their effectiveness, with changing and sometimes conflicting conclusions.

=== Organizational changes ===
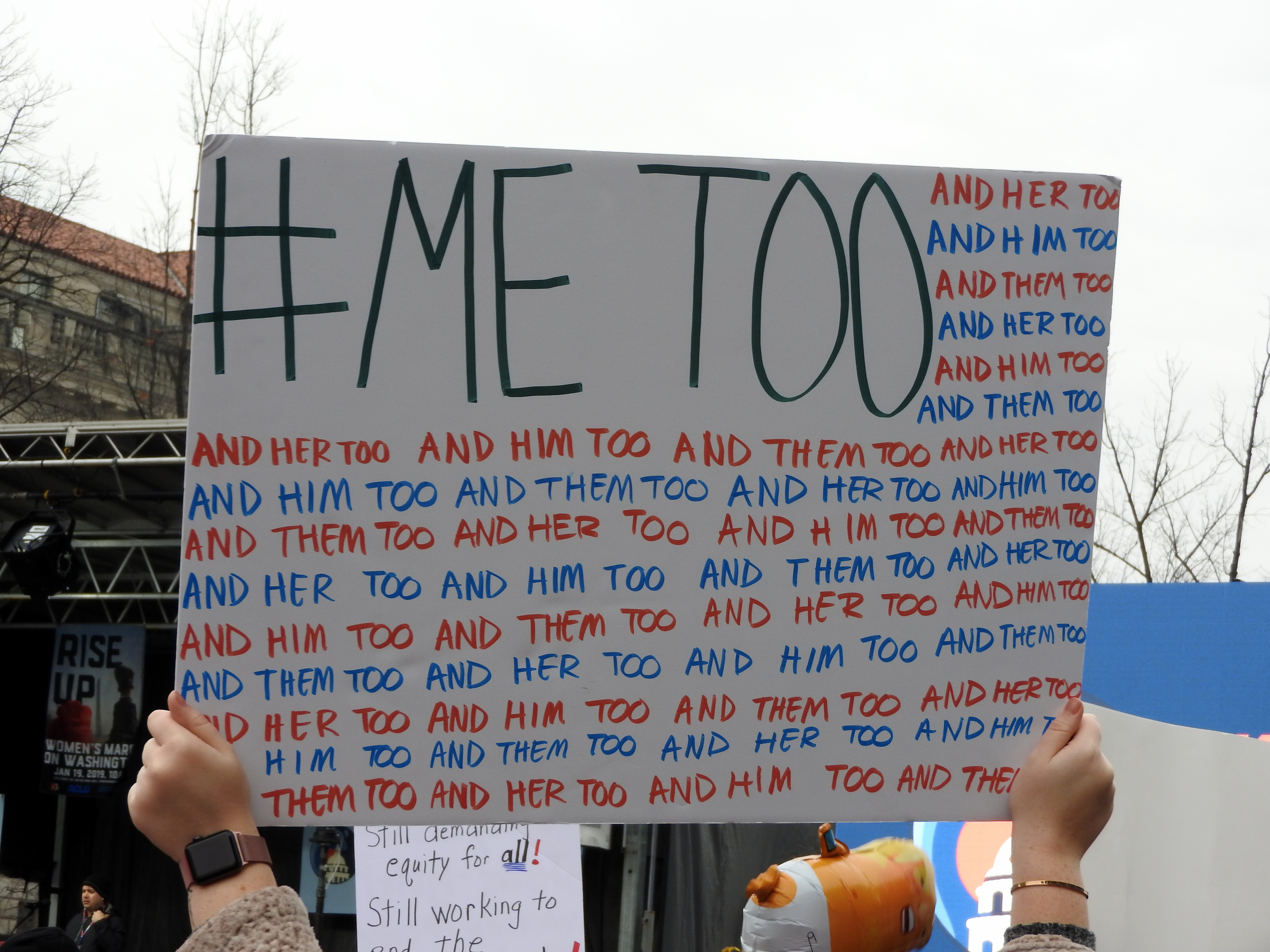
#MeToo movement sign

Harassment in large organizations, such as workplaces or schools, can be predicted by certain organizational factors; if these change, the level of harassment may change. The first step to decreasing organizational harassment is talking about it, acknowledging how large a problem it is, and signaling a willingness to find real solutions.

Organizational tolerance for sexual harassment is a large factor in enabling harassment. If leadership is vocal about not tolerating harassment and actively intervenes when it arises, this helps limit harassment in the organization. Leaders who commit themselves to decreasing harassment by joining dedicated task forces and putting personal effort into working on the problem are likely to drive the organization to change. Leaders are also effective at limiting harassment because they can design creative solutions, operating outside of basic processes or policies that are ineffective at curbing harassment. Finally, leaders serve as role models to the rest of the organization, and their stance on harassment can shape organizational culture. This is especially important for decreasing intersectional sexual harassment. For one example, having school leaders be educated on allyship and signaling institutional support for smaller student populations can result in lower harassment of LGBTQ students at those schools.

Organizational structure also affects harassment within an organization. If employees feel more secure in their jobs due to their contract structure, they are less likely to be harassed. If an organization promotes a more respectful culture, it can also reduce sexual harassment. This has additional benefits, in that incivility tends to alienate women and people of color disproportionately. Changes that increase engagement with an organization or employee job satisfaction often reduce harassment at the same time.

Gender imbalances in an organization are a large factor in the likelihood of sexual harassment. Changing an organization's practices and structure so that power is more equally distributed across people, regardless of their gender, can decrease harassment. Hiring, retaining, and promoting people into positions of power in ways that even out gender imbalances also reduces harassment. Studies have mostly examined this in the context of increasing women's power in workspaces dominated by men.

=== Training and awareness ===
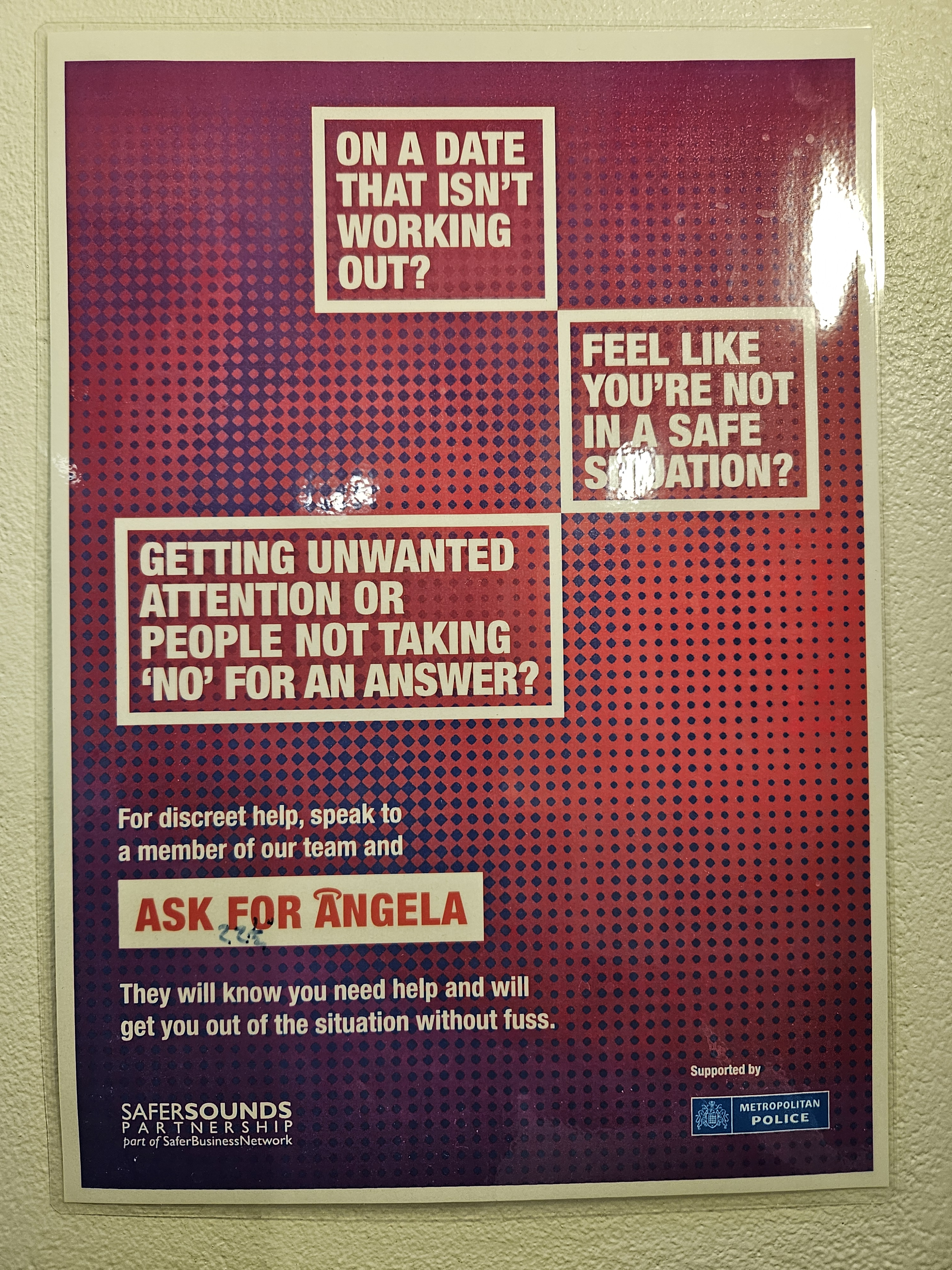
This Ask for Angela poster informs readers of an option for getting help from a venue's staff in dealing with sexual harassment or safety issues.

Prevention strategies often start with raising awareness and advocating for cultures and organizations to stop tolerating harassment. Sexual harassment and assault may be prevented by secondary school, college, and workplace education programs. At least one program for fraternity men produced "sustained behavioral change".

Many sororities and fraternities in the United States take preventive measures against hazing and hazing activities during the participants' pledging processes (which may often include sexual harassment). Many Greek organizations and universities nationwide have anti-hazing policies that explicitly recognize various forms of hazing and provide preventive measures to address such situations.

Current workplace anti-sexual harassment training programs, policies, and reporting mechanisms have little evidence of effectiveness. Many trainings succeed at teaching people about harassment-related laws and policies, but not on acting better, and "some studies suggest that training may in fact backfire, reinforcing gendered stereotypes that place women at a disadvantage". There is evidence that ineffective trainings can make men scared to interact with women due to heightened fears that they will be falsely accused of harassment, thus leading to gender-based discrimination.

News report about a harassment and bystander intervention workshop held for employees at a coffee shop.

In-person training that is customized to a single workplace and involves active tasks, lasting longer than a few hours, has stronger evidence of effectiveness and a lower risk of backfiring. How leaders have signaled their intentions behind the training is also important: employees react differently to training depending on why they think their manager is providing the training. Anti-harassment training that solely targets managers is also effective, because it is often presented in a way that reduces managers' defensiveness at receiving the training. These often present harassment as a common issue that managers must root out and treat managers as potential allies, teaching them new techniques rather than treating them as potential harassers.

Evidence shows that bystander intervention training is more effective at changing harassment culture than standard anti-harassment training. Bystander intervention focuses on teaching positive skills people can use to intervene when they see harassment or other problems. These trainings do not make students as defensive as sexual harassment trainings: students are taught positive skills rather than told what to avoid, and are treated as potential allies rather than harassers. Systematic, well-made bystander intervention training has been shown to decrease the amount of harassment where it is implemented in higher education institutions.

=== Non-institutional methods ===
French ad campaign designed to show men sexually harassing requests on International Women's Day 2018.

In settings where people do not receive institutional support against sexual harassment, people find their own safety, advocacy, and response mechanisms. People have organized public protests and performance art to raise awareness of street harassment in their communities and decrease tolerance for it. There is evidence that people grow less likely to sexually harass or believe harassment myths when they learn about how harassment affects victims through personal stories. Projects like HARASSmap and Hollaback! collect harassment stories to raise awareness and lower tolerance for harassment in certain communities, using the stories to safely intervene and educate people about stopping harassment where it is prevalent.

The use of audio and video recording can help document sexual harassment for reporting. Audio recording apps are available for use on smartphones, and can for instance be used during job interviews.

== Impact ==
"Is it just a joke?" animates the story of a girl getting sexually harassed at school over her friendship with a boy.

The impact of sexual harassment can vary. In research carried out by the EU Fundamental Rights Agency, 17,335 female victims of sexual assault were asked to name the feelings that resulted from the most serious incident of sexual assault that they had encountered since the age of 15. 'Anger, annoyance, and embarrassment were the most common emotional responses, with 45% of women feeling anger, 41% annoyance, and 36% embarrassment. Furthermore, close to one in three women (29%) who have experienced sexual harassment have said that they felt fearful as a result of the most serious incident, while one in five (20%) victims say that the most serious incident made them feel ashamed of what had taken place. In other situations, harassment may lead to temporary or prolonged stress or depression, depending on the recipient's psychological abilities to cope and the type of harassment and the social support or lack thereof for the recipient. Harnois and Bastos (2018) show an association between women's perceptions of workplace sexual harassment and self-reported physical health. In addition, a study conducted in 2010 indicated that workplace sexual harassment is linked to greater mental health issues and lower job satisfaction, regardless of assessment technique or gender. Psychologists and social workers report that severe or chronic sexual harassment can have the same psychological effects as rape or sexual assault. For example, in 1995, Judith Coflin committed suicide after chronic sexual harassment by her bosses and coworkers. Her family was later awarded six million dollars in punitive and compensatory damages. Victims who do not submit to harassment may also experience various forms of retaliation, including isolation and bullying.

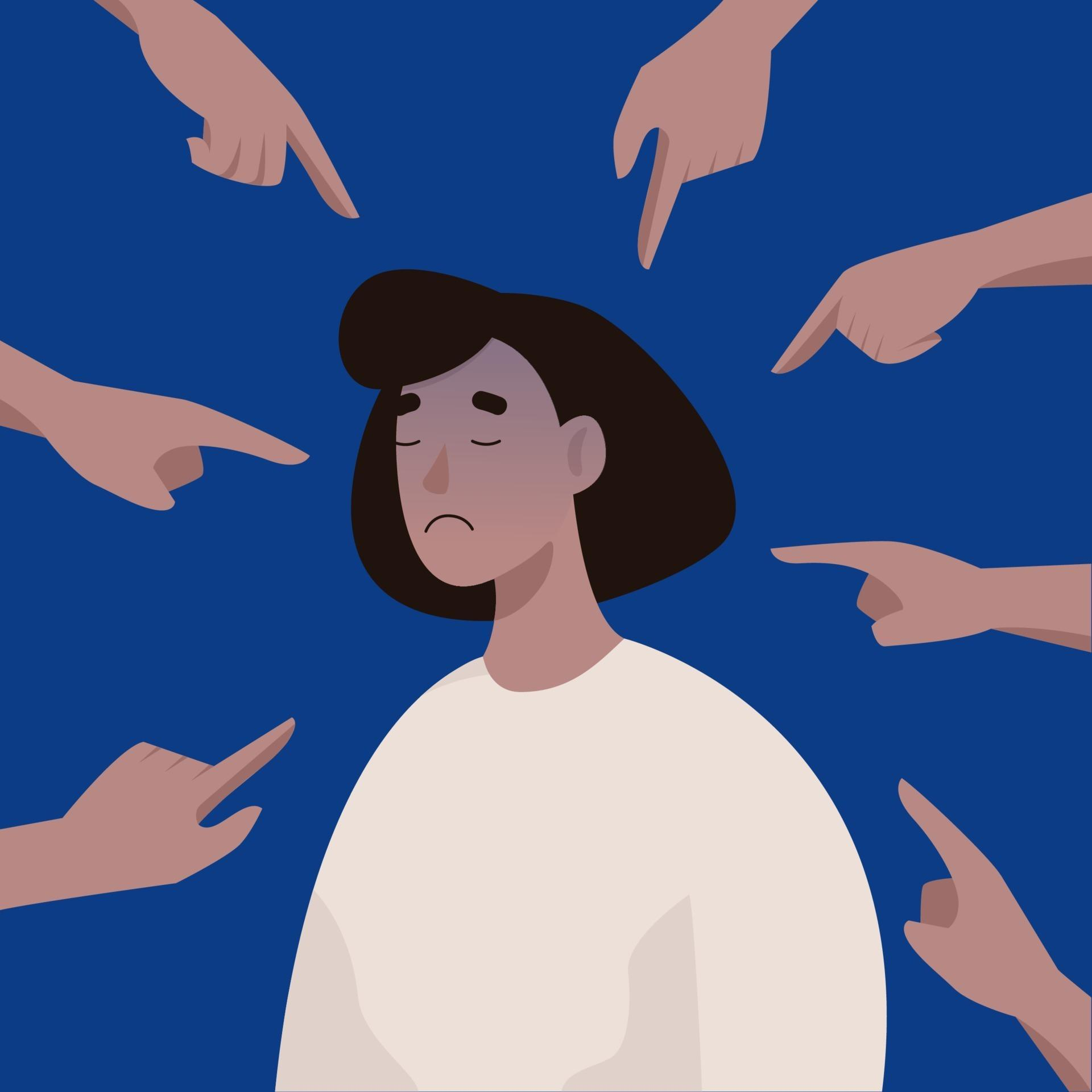
Illustration portraying the humiliation that repeated workplace harassment has caused for a young woman.

As an overall social and economic effect every year, sexual harassment deprives women from active social and economic participation; it costs hundreds of millions of dollars in lost educational and professional opportunities for mostly girls and women. However, the quantity of men implied in these conflicts is significant.

=== Coping ===
Sexual harassment, by definition, is unwanted and not to be tolerated. There are ways, however, for offended and injured people to overcome the resultant psychological effects, remain in or return to society, regain healthy feelings within personal relationships when they were affected by the outside relationship trauma, regain social approval, and recover the ability to concentrate and be productive in educational and work environments. These include stress management and therapy, cognitive-behavioral therapy, friends and family support, and advocacy.

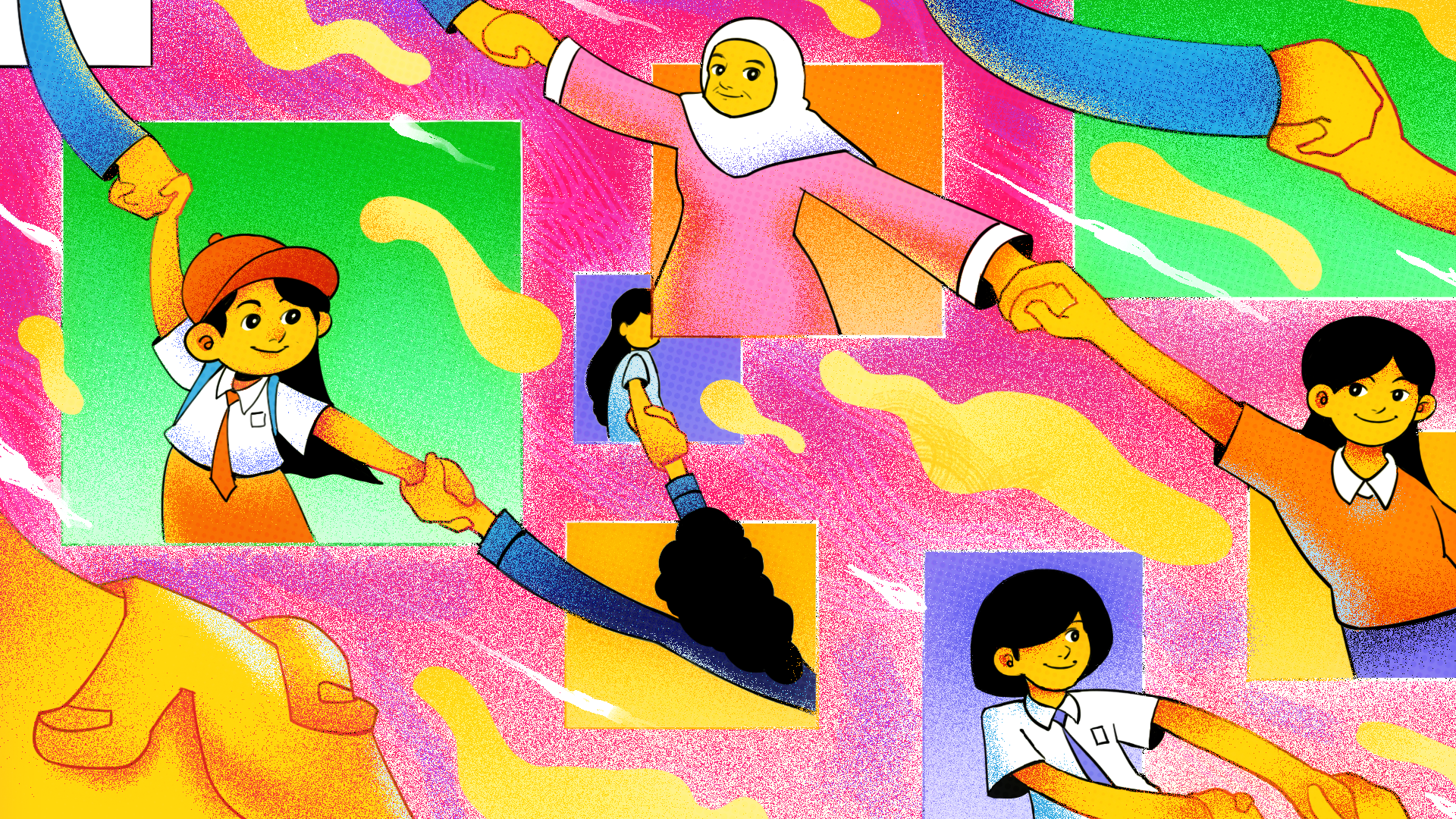
Illustration portraying the community care, equality, and empathy that help targets of sexual violence or harassment.

A 1991 study done by K.R. Yount found three dominant strategies developed by a sample of women coal miners to manage sexual harassment on the job: the "lady", the "flirt", and the "tomboy". The "ladies" were typically older women workers who tended to disengage from the men, kept their distance, avoided profanity, and refrained from any behavior that might be interpreted as suggestive. They also tended to emphasize, through their appearance and manners, that they were ladies. The consequences for the "ladies" were that they were the targets of the least amount of come-ons, teasing, and sexual harassment, but they also accepted the least prestigious and lowest-paid jobs.

The "flirts" were most often the younger single women. As a defense mechanism, they pretended to be flattered when they were the targets of sexual comments. Consequently, they became perceived as the "embodiment of the female stereotype,... as particularly lacking in potential and were given the fewest opportunities to develop job skills and to establish social and self-identities as miners". The "tomboys" were generally single women, but were older than the "flirts". They attempted to separate themselves from the female stereotype and focused on their status as coal miners, and tried to develop a "thick skin". They responded to harassment with humor, comebacks, sexual talk of their own, or reciprocation. As a result, they were often viewed as sluts or sexually promiscuous and as women who violated the sexual double standard. Consequently, they were subjected to intensified and increased harassment by some men. It was unclear whether the tomboy strategy led to better or worse job assignments.

The findings of this study may apply to other work settings, including factories, restaurants, offices, and universities. The study concludes that individual strategies for coping with sexual harassment are not likely to be effective and may have unexpected negative consequences for the workplace, and may even lead to increased sexual harassment. Women who try to deal with sexual harassment on their own, regardless of what they do, seem to be in a no-win situation. For example, after an anti-groping device allowing victims to mark their assailants with an invisible ink stamp has been released in Japan, some experts claimed it is wrong to put the onus on the victim.

=== Common effects on the victims ===
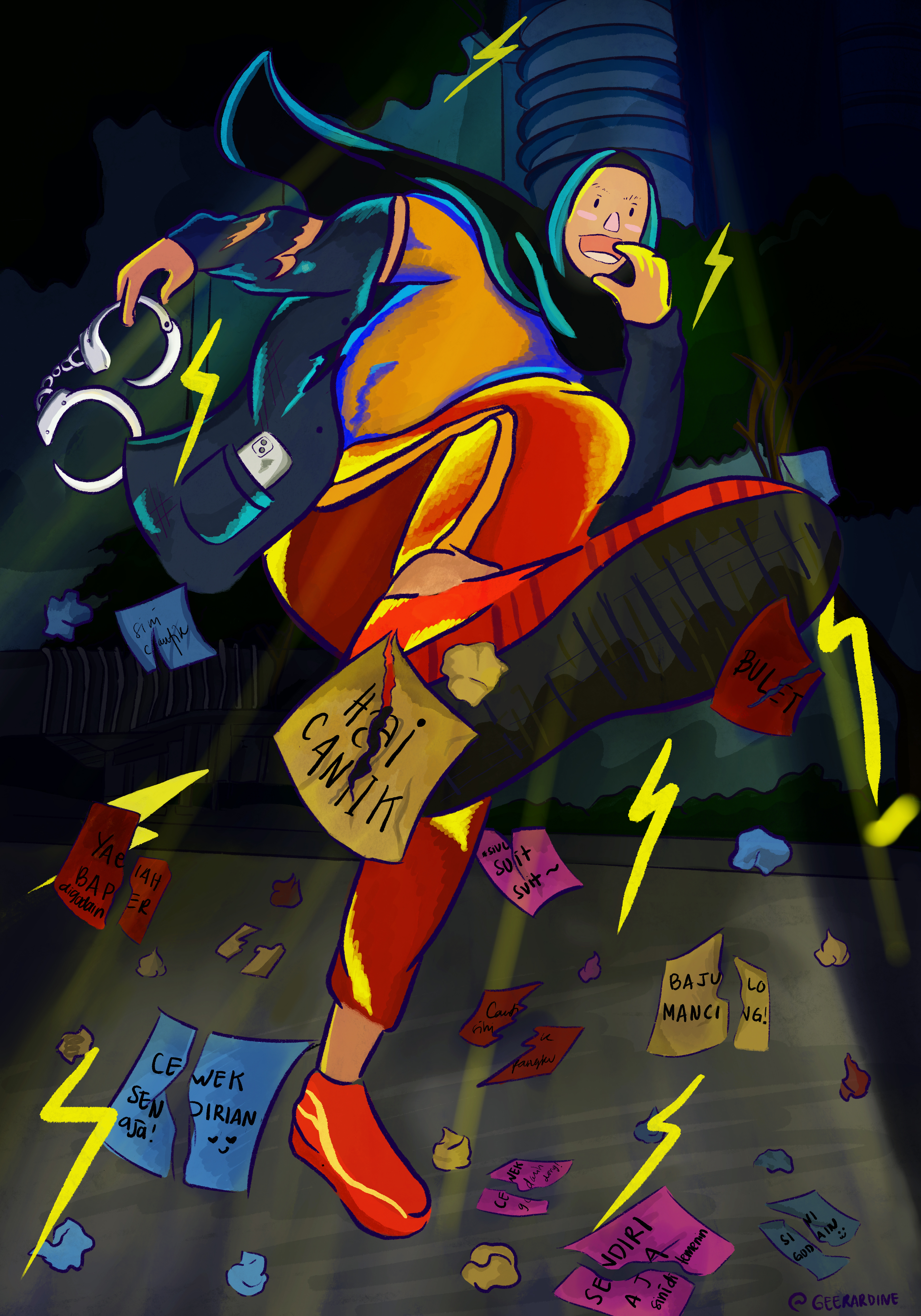
Activist illustration against cat-calling, created as part of the #GantiIlustrasiBeritaKS Remotivi and Wikimedia Indonesia campaign against the ways that Indonesian media portrays the victims of sexual violence.

Common psychological, academic, professional, financial, and social effects of sexual harassment and retaliation:

- Becoming publicly sexualized (i.e., groups of people "evaluate" the victim to establish if they are "worth" the sexual attention or the risk to the harasser's career)
- Being objectified and humiliated by scrutiny and gossip
- Decreased work or school performance as a result of stress conditions; increased absenteeism due to fear of harassment repetition
- Defamation of character and reputation
- Effects on sexual life and relationships: can put extreme stress upon relationships with significant others, sometimes resulting in divorce
- Firing and refusal for a job opportunity can lead to loss of job or career, loss of income
- Having one's personal life offered up for public scrutiny—the victim becomes the "accused", and their dress, lifestyle, and private life will often come under attack.
- Having to drop courses, change academic plans, or leave school (loss of tuition) in fear of harassment repetition or as a result of stress
- Having to relocate to another city, another job, or another school
- Loss of references/recommendations
- Loss of trust in environments similar to where the harassment occurred
- Loss of trust in the types of people that occupy similar positions as the harasser or their colleagues, especially in cases where they are not supportive, difficulties or stress in peer relationships, or relationships with colleagues
- Psychological stress and health impairment
- Weakening of support network, or being ostracized from professional or academic circles (friends, colleagues, or family may distance themselves from the victim, or shun them altogether)

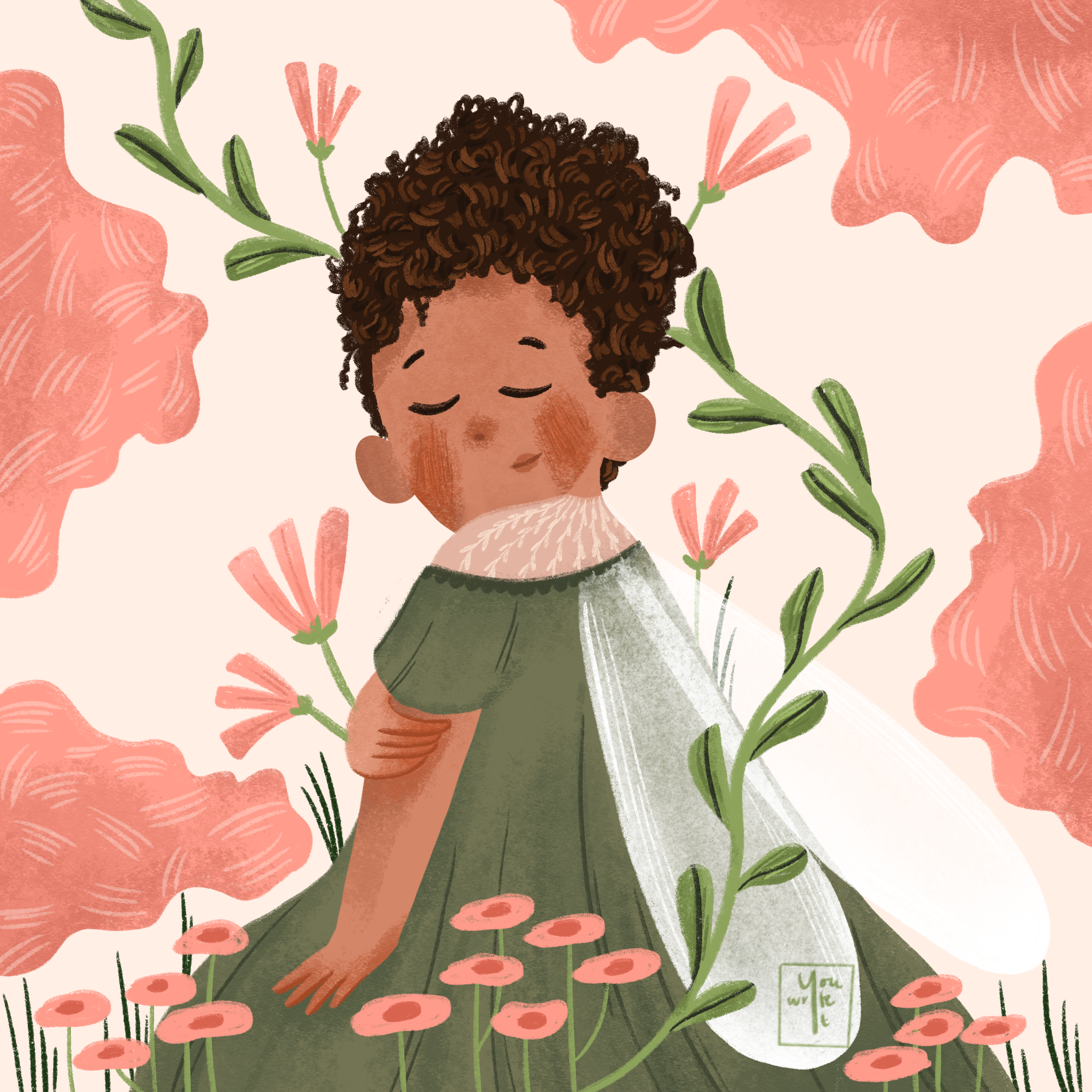
Illustration for the #GantiIlustrasiBeritaKS campaign against sexual violence, depicting a woman healing from trauma.

Some of the psychological and health effects that can occur in someone who has been sexually harassed as a result of stress and humiliation: depression; anxiety; panic attacks; sleeplessness; nightmares; shame; guilt; difficulty concentrating; headaches; fatigue; loss of motivation; stomach problems; eating disorders (such as weight loss or gain); alcoholism; feeling betrayed, violated, angry, violent towards the perpetrator, powerless or out of control; increased blood pressure; loss of confidence or self-esteem; withdrawal; isolation; overall loss of trust in people; traumatic stress; post-traumatic stress disorder (PTSD); complex post-traumatic stress disorder; suicidal thoughts or attempts, and suicide.

=== Post-complaint retaliation and backlash ===
Retaliation and backlash against a victim are very common, particularly against a complainant. Victims who speak out against sexual harassment are often labeled troublemakers who are on their own "power trips" or who are looking for attention. Similar to cases of rape or sexual assault, the victim often becomes the accused, with their appearance, private life, and character likely to fall under intrusive scrutiny and attack. Excuses for victim blaming include clothing and behavior. They risk hostility and isolation from colleagues, supervisors, teachers, fellow students, and even friends. They may become the targets of mobbing or relational aggression.

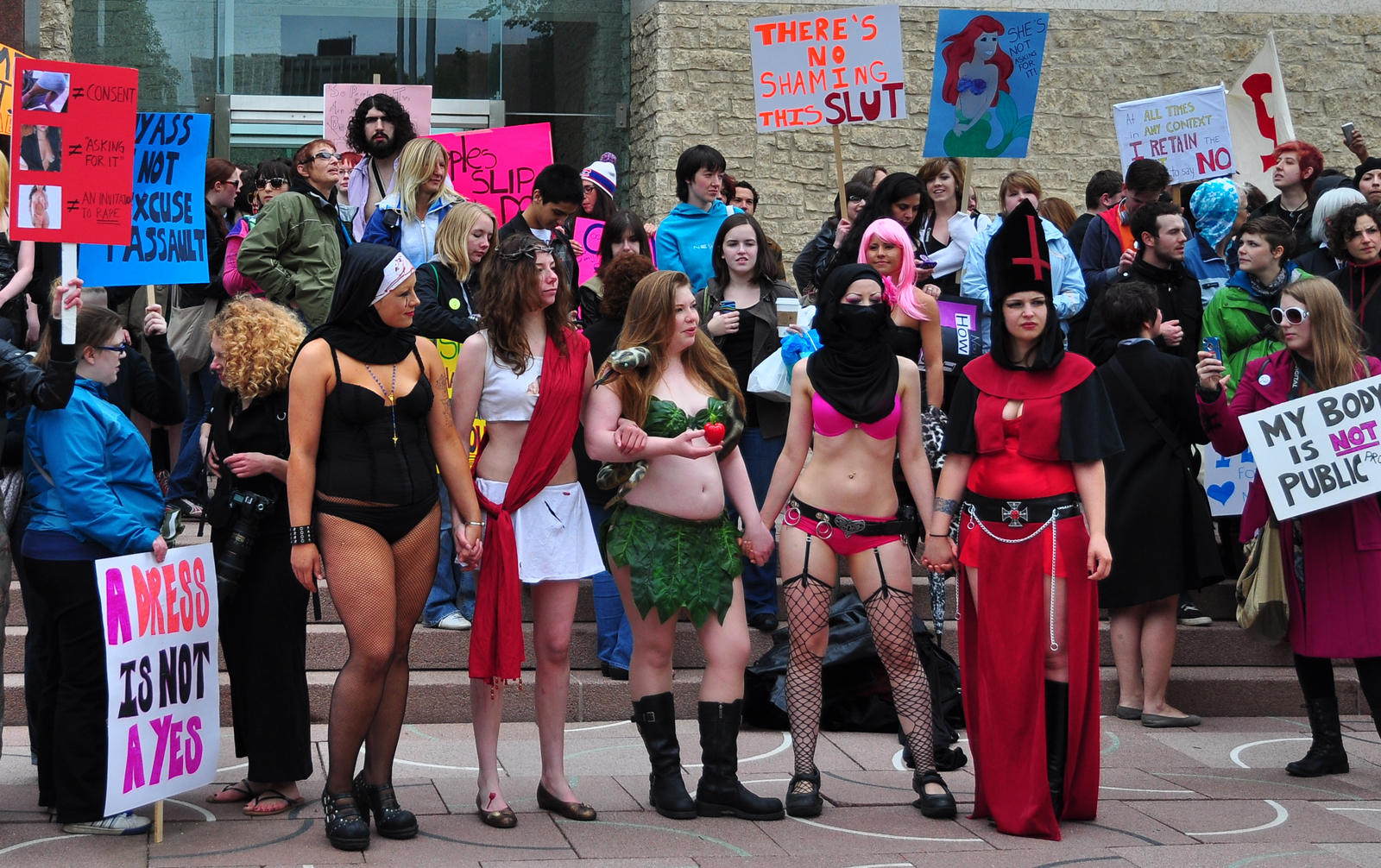
2011 Edmonton protest against the victim blaming of rape and sexual assault survivors.

Women are not necessarily sympathetic to other women who have been sexually harassed. If the harasser was male, internalized sexism (or jealousy over the sexual attention towards the victim) may encourage some women to react with as much hostility towards the complainant as some male colleagues. Fear of being targeted for harassment or retaliation themselves may also cause some women to respond with hostility. For example, when Lois Jenson filed her lawsuit against Eveleth Taconite Co., the women shunned her both at work and in the community—many of these women later joined her suit. Women may even project hostility onto the victim to bond with their male coworkers and build trust.

Art about women's objectification, inspired by an online comment criticizing a woman who had been harassed.

Retaliation has occurred when a sexual harassment victim suffers a negative action as a result of the harassment. For example, a complainant may be given poor evaluations or low grades, have their projects sabotaged, be denied work or academic opportunities, or have their work hours cut back. Other actions against them that undermine their productivity or their ability to advance at work or school include being fired after reporting sexual harassment, or leading to unemployment, as they may be suspended, asked to resign, or be fired from their jobs altogether. Retaliation can even involve further sexual harassment, and also stalking and cyberstalking of the victim. Moreover, a school professor or employer accused of sexual harassment, or who is the colleague of a perpetrator, can use their power to see that a victim is never hired again (blacklisting), or never accepted to another school.

Of the women who have approached her to share their own experiences of being sexually harassed by their teachers, feminist writer Naomi Wolf wrote in 2004:

I am ashamed of what I tell them: that they should indeed worry about making an accusation because what they fear is likely to come true. Not one of the women I have heard from had an outcome that was not worse for her than silence. One, I recall, was drummed out of the school by peer pressure. Many faced bureaucratic stonewalling. Some women said they lost their academic status as golden girls overnight; grants dried up, letters of recommendation were no longer forthcoming. No one was met with a coherent process that was not weighted against them. Usually, the key decision-makers in the college or university—especially if it was a private university—joined forces to, in effect, collude with the faculty member accused; to protect not him necessarily but the reputation of the university, and to keep information from surfacing in a way that could protect other women. The goal seemed to be not to provide a balanced forum, but damage control.

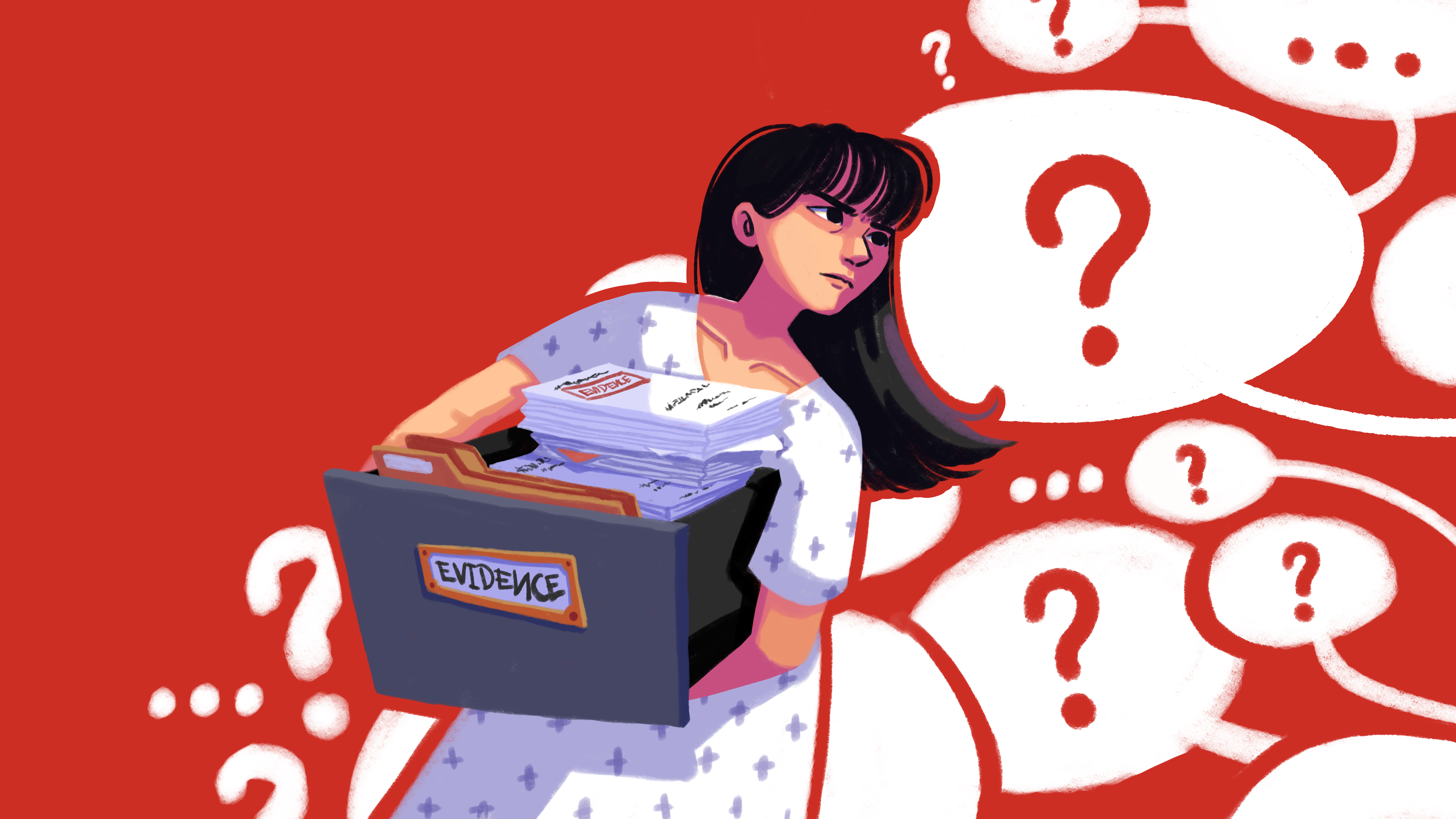
Illustration depicting the practice of repeatedly questioning sexual assault survivors.

Another woman whom sociologist Helen Watson interviewed said, "Facing up to the crime and having to deal with it in public is probably worse than suffering in silence. I found it to be a lot worse than the harassment itself."

=== Backlash stress ===
Backlash stress is stress resulting from uncertainty regarding changing norms for interacting with women in the workplace. Backlash stress now deters many male workers from befriending female colleagues, or providing them with any assistance, such as holding doors open. As a result, women are being handicapped by a lack of the necessary networking and mentorship.

== Organizational policies and procedures ==
Most companies have policies against sexual harassment; however, these policies are not designed to and should not attempt to "regulate romance," which goes against human urges.

Act upon a report of harassment inside the organization:

The investigation should be designed to obtain a prompt and thorough collection of the facts, an appropriate responsive action, and an expeditious report to the complainant that the investigation has been concluded, and, to the full extent appropriate, the action taken.

— Mark I. Schickman, Sexual Harassment. The employer's role in prevention. American Bar Association

When organizations do not take the necessary satisfactory measures for properly investigating, stress and psychological counseling and guidance, and just deciding on the problem, this could lead to:

- Decreased productivity and increased team conflict
- Decreased study or job satisfaction
- Loss of students and staff. Loss of students who leave school and staff resignations to avoid harassment. Resignations and firings of alleged harassers.
- Decreased productivity and increased absenteeism by staff or students experiencing harassment
- Decrease in success at meeting academic and financial goals
- Increased health-care and sick-pay costs because of the health consequences of harassment or retaliation
- The knowledge that harassment is permitted can undermine ethical standards and discipline in the organization in general, as staff or students lose respect for, and trust in, their seniors who indulge in, or turn a blind eye to, or treat improperly, sexual harassment
- If the problem is ignored or not treated properly, a company's or school's image can suffer
- High jury awards for the employee, attorney fees, and litigation costs if the problem is ignored or not treated properly (in case of firing the victim) when the complainants are advised to and take the issue to court.

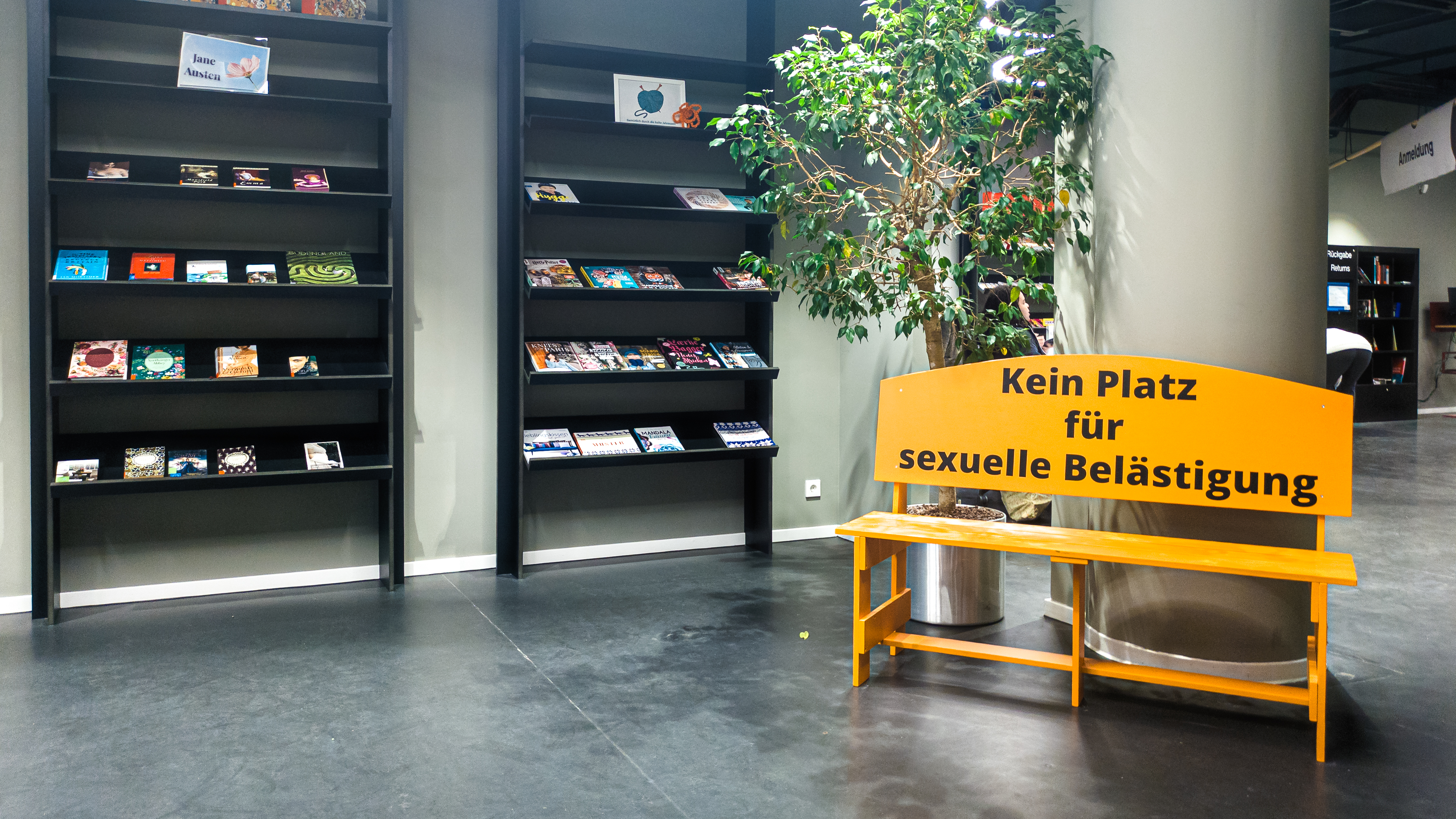
Bench at the Cologne Central Library painted with "No place for sexual harassment" in German.

Studies show that organizational climate (an organization's tolerance, policy, procedure etc.) and workplace environment are essential for understanding the conditions in which sexual harassment is likely to occur, and the way its victims will be affected (yet, research on specific policy and procedure, and awareness strategies is lacking). Another element which increases the risk for sexual harassment is the job's gender context (having few women in the close working environment or practicing in a field which is perceived as atypical for women).

Although research on occupational sexual assault is still in its infancy, the European Union reports that 40–50% of women report having encountered inappropriate sexual conduct or sexual harassment at work (World Health Organization, 2012). According to Burn (2018), to reduce sexual harassment, organizational climates and circumstances that support sexual harassment must change. Changes to the normative environments that sustain sexual harassment include the adoption of explicit anti-harassment rules and practices. Sexual harassment rules have the potential to deter sexual harassment and provide victims with channels for redress. According to Medeiros (2019), the current endeavor puts out a framework for creating workplace sexual harassment prevention programmes and is based on research on training and development, college sexual assault, and workplace sexual harassment. The suggestions for preventing sexual harassment are mostly based on the research on sexual assault on college campuses. The persistent curiosity in and study of educational institutions for sexual assault preventative measures, despite this approach's shortcomings, has produced a database of researched interventions that fills in the gaps left by the dearth of empirical studies on sexual assault preventive interventions. Additionally, sexual harassment and assault have been characterized as a continuum where less severe behaviors have the potential to escalate into more violent acts over time if left unchecked (Department of Defense, 2014; Fitzgerald,1993). Hence, even if sexual harassment and assault are distinct behaviors, their increasing prevalence indicates that interventions ought to address the entire range of behaviors, particularly considering the restricted time and financial resources allocated to educational programs.

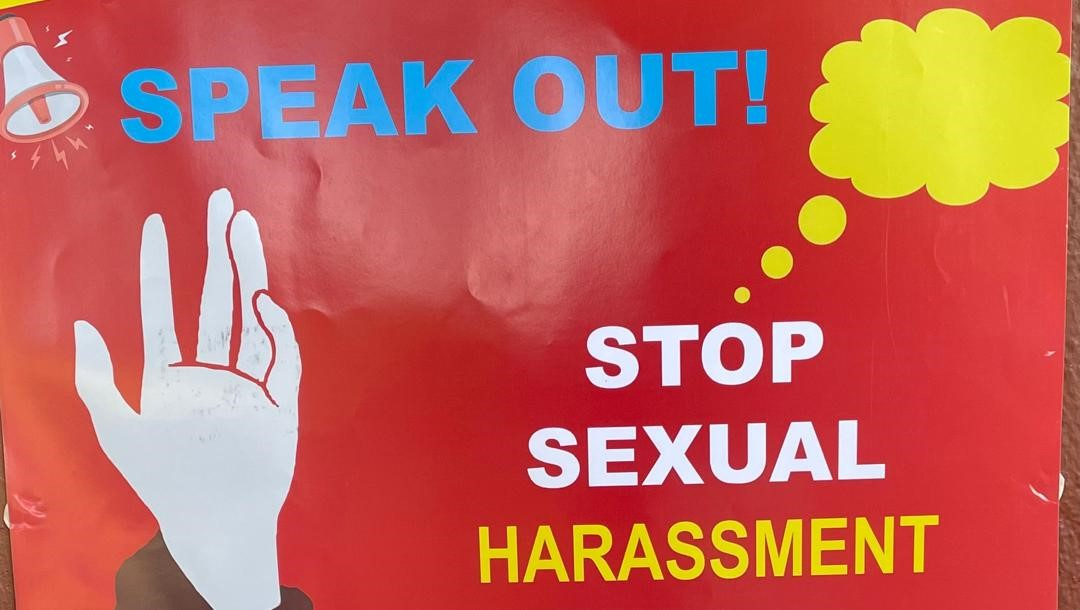
A poster telling people to speak out against sexual harassment

According to Dr. Orit Kamir, the most effective way to prevent sexual harassment in the workplace and influence public opinion is for employers to adopt a clear policy prohibiting sexual harassment and make it very clear to their employees. Many women prefer to make a complaint and to have the matter resolved within the workplace rather than to "air out the dirty laundry" with a public complaint and be seen as a traitor by colleagues, superiors and employers, adds Kamir.

Most prefer a pragmatic solution that would stop the harassment and prevent future contact with the harasser rather than turning to the police. More about the difficulty in turning an offense into a legal act can be found in Felstiner & Sarat's (1981) study, which describes three steps a victim (of any dispute) must go through before turning to the justice system: naming—giving the assault a definition, blaming—understanding who is responsible for the violation of rights and facing them, and finally, claiming—turning to the authorities.

== Evolution of law in different jurisdictions ==
It may include a range of actions from mild transgressions to sexual abuse or sexual assault. Sexual harassment is a form of illegal employment discrimination in many countries, and is a form of abuse (sexual and psychological abuses) and bullying.

The Declaration on the Elimination of Violence Against Women classifies violence against women into three categories: that occurring in the family, that occurring within the general community, and that perpetrated or condoned by the State. The term sexual harassment is used in defining violence occurring in the general community, which is defined as: "Physical, sexual and psychological violence occurring within the general community, including rape, sexual abuse, sexual harassment and intimidation at work, in educational institutions and elsewhere, trafficking in women and forced prostitution."

Sexual harassment is subject to a directive in the European Union. The United States' Equal Employment Opportunity Commission (EEOC) states, "It is unlawful to harass a person (an applicant or employee) because of that person's sex."

In India, the case of Vishakha and others v State of Rajasthan in 1997 has been credited with establishing sexual harassment as illegal. In Israel, the 1988 Equal Employment Opportunity Law made it a crime for an employer to retaliate against an employee who had rejected sexual advances, but it was not until 1998 that the Israeli Sexual Harassment Law made such behavior illegal.

In May 2002, the European Union Council and Parliament amended a 1976 Council Directive on the equal treatment of men and women in employment to prohibit sexual harassment in the workplace, naming it a form of sex discrimination and violation of dignity. This Directive required all Member States of the European Union to adopt laws on sexual harassment, or amend existing laws to comply with the Directive by October 2005.

In 2005, China added new provisions to the Law on Women's Rights Protection to include sexual harassment. In 2006, "The Shanghai Supplement" was drafted to help further define sexual harassment in China.

Sexual harassment was specifically criminalized for the first time in modern Egyptian history in June 2014.

As of 2016, sexual harassment remains legal in Kuwait and Djibouti.

=== Varied legal guidelines and definitions ===
The United Nations General Recommendation 19 to the convention on the Elimination of all Forms of Discrimination Against Women defines sexual harassment of women to include:

such unwelcome sexually determined behavior as physical contact and advances, sexually colored remarks, showing pornography and sexual demands, whether by words or actions. Such conduct can be humiliating and may constitute a health and safety problem; it is discriminatory when the woman has reasonable ground to believe that her objection would disadvantage her in connection with her employment, including recruitment or promotion, or when it creates a hostile working environment.

While such conduct can be harassment of women by men, many laws around the world that prohibit sexual harassment recognize that both men and women may be harassers or victims of sexual harassment. However, most claims of sexual harassment are made by women.

There are many similarities and also important differences in laws and definitions used around the world.

=== Africa ===
==== Egypt ====
Sexual harassment is rife in Egypt. A 2013 study from the United Nations showed that 99.3 percent of Egyptian women have suffered some form of sexual harassment. Authorities punish women when they do speak out.

==== Morocco ====
In 2016, a stricter law proscribing sexual harassment was proposed in Morocco, specifying fines and a possible jail sentence of up to 6 months. The existing law against harassment was reported not to be upheld, as harassment was not reported to police by victims and even when reported, was not investigated by police or prosecuted by the courts. On 1 June 2023, a Moroccan court sentenced a 32-year-old man to two years in prison for sexually harassing and forcibly kissing a woman inside a church.

=== Australia ===
The Sex Discrimination Act 1984 defines sexual harassment as "... a person sexually harasses another person (the person harassed ) if: (a) the person makes an unwelcome sexual advance, or an unwelcome request for sexual favours, to the person harassed; or (b) engages in other unwelcome conduct of a sexual nature in relation to the person harassed; in circumstances in which a reasonable person, having regard to all the circumstances, would have anticipated the possibility that the person harassed would be offended, humiliated or intimidated".

=== Europe ===
In the European Union, there is a directive on sexual harassment. The Directive 2002/73/EC – equal treatment of 23 September 2002 amending Council Directive 76/207/EEC on the implementation of the principle of equal treatment for men and women as regards access to employment, vocational training and promotion, and working conditions states:

For the purposes of this Directive, the following definitions shall apply: (...)

- sexual harassment: where any form of unwanted verbal, non-verbal or physical conduct of a sexual nature occurs, with the purpose or effect of violating the dignity of a person, in particular when creating an intimidating, hostile, degrading, humiliating or offensive environment

Harassment and sexual harassment within the meaning of this Directive shall be deemed to be discrimination on the grounds of sex and therefore prohibited.

The Convention on preventing and combating violence against women and domestic violence also addresses the issue of sexual harassment (Article 40), using a similar definition.

==== Denmark ====
Sexual harassment is defined as any verbal, non-verbal, or physical action used to change a victim's sexual status against the will of the victim. It results in the victim feeling inferior or having their dignity hurt. Men and women are looked upon as equal, and any action trying to change the balance in status with the differences in sex as a tool is also sexual harassment. In the workplace, jokes, remarks, etc., are considered discriminatory only if the employer has stated so in their written policy. Law number 1385 of 21 December 2005 regulates this area.

==== France ====
In France, both the Criminal Code and the Labor Code are relevant to sexual harassment. Until 4 May 2012, article 222-33 of the French Criminal Code described sexual harassment as "The fact of harassing anyone in order to obtain favors of a sexual nature". Since 2002, the law has recognized the possibility of sexual harassment between co-workers and not only by supervisors. On 4 May 2012, the Supreme Court of France quashed the definition of the criminal code as being too vague. The 2012 decision resulted from a law on priority preliminary rulings on the issue of constitutionality. As a consequence of this decision, all pending procedures before criminal courts were canceled. Several feminist NGOs, such as AFVT, criticized this decision. President François Hollande, the Minister of Justice (Christiane Taubira), and the Minister of Equality (Najat Belkacem) asked that a new law be voted on rapidly. As a result, LOI n°2012-954 du 6 août 2012 was voted in, providing a new definition. In addition to criminal provisions, the French Labor code also prohibits sexual harassment. The legislator voted a law in 2008 that copied the 2002/73/EC Directive definition without modifying the French Labour Code.

According to Abigail C. Saguy in her book What is Sexual Harassment: From Capitol Hill to the Sorbonne, "According to French penal law, sexual harassment is also different from rape and sexual assault in that it does not involve physical contact. Rather, with sexual harassment, economic dependence and official authority alone are used to pressure a person into having sexual relations(pg.24)."

==== Germany ====
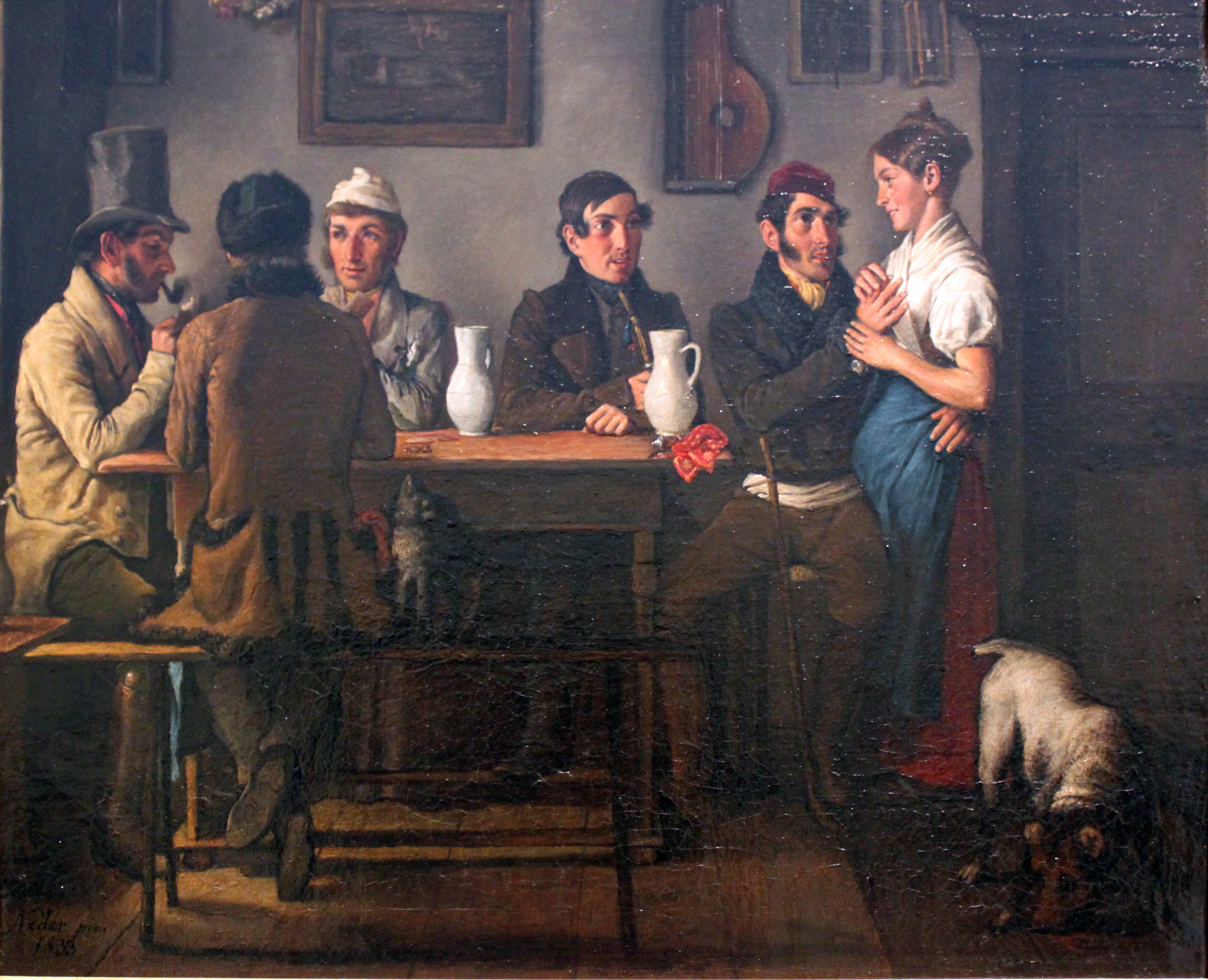
At the Tavern, by Johann Michael Neder, 1833, Germanisches Nationalmuseum

In June 2016, the governing coalition decided on the key points of a tightening of the law governing sexual offenses (Sexualstrafrecht, literally: law on the punishment of sexual delicts). On 7 July 2016, the Bundestag passed the resolution and by fall of that year, the draft bill will be presented to the second chamber, the Bundesrat. By this change, sexual harassment shall become punishable under the Sexualstrafrecht.

Now, sexual harassment is punishable by law according to § 184i of the law governing sexual offenses. The law only states unwanted physical contact as sexual harassment, but has been extended in 2020 to include "cybergrooming" as well.

==== Greece ====
In response to the EU Directive 2002/73/EC, Greece enacted Law 3488/2006 (O.G.A. 191). The law specifies that sexual harassment is a form of gender-based discrimination in the workplace. Victims also have the right to compensation. Before this law, the policy on sexual harassment in Greece was very weak. No law defined sexual harassment, and victims could only use general laws, which were very poor in addressing the issue.

==== Russia ====
As of 2023, there is no formal law in Russia that prohibits or criminalizes repeated sexual harassment or any sexual advancements that result in women or men losing their jobs or any other adverse effects that can be proven in a court of law. Per articles 132-133 of the Criminal Code of Russian Federation (CC RF), only criminal sexual conduct is outlawed, including all non-consensual sex between individuals: rape, sex with underage, etc. Per Article 133 (formerly Article 118 of the CC RF 1990), various forms of extortion and coercion are also criminalized.

According to a 1997 Moscow Center for Gender Studies study, in practically all cases, authorities did not investigate or enforce these articles.

In 2008, The Daily Telegraph quoted a survey in which "100 percent of female professionals [in Russia] said they had been subjected to sexual harassment by their bosses, 32 percent said they had had intercourse with them at least once and another seven percent claimed to have been raped."

==== Switzerland ====
A ban on discrimination was included in the Federal Constitution (Article 4, Paragraph 2 of the old Federal Constitution) in 1981 and adopted in Article 8, Paragraph 2 of the revised Constitution. The ban on sexual harassment in the workplace forms part of the Federal Act on Gender Equality (GEA) of 24 March 1995, which includes several provisions prohibiting discrimination in employment and is intended to promote equality. Article 4 of the GEA defines the circumstances, Article 5 sets out legal rights, and Article 10 protects against dismissal during the complaints procedure. Article 328, paragraph 1 of the Code of Obligations (OR), Article 198 (2) of the Penal Code (StGB) and Article 6, paragraph 1 of the Employment Act (ArG) contain further statutory provisions on the ban on sexual harassment. The ban on sexual harassment is intended exclusively for employers, within the scope of their responsibility for protecting legal personality, mental and physical well-being, and health.

Article 4 of the GEA of 1995 discusses the topic of sexual harassment in the workplace: "Any harassing behaviour of a sexual nature or other behaviour related to the person's sex that adversely affects the dignity of women or men in the workplace is discriminatory. Such behaviour includes in particular threats, the promise of advantages, the use of coercion and the exertion of pressure in order to obtain favours of a sexual nature."

==== United Kingdom ====
The Discrimination Act of 1975 was amended in 1986 to establish sexual harassment as a form of discrimination. It states that harassment occurs where there is unwanted conduct on the ground of a person's sex or unwanted conduct of a sexual nature and that conduct has the purpose or effect of violating a person's dignity, or of creating an intimidating, hostile, degrading, humiliating or offensive environment for them. If an employer treats someone less favorably because they have rejected, or submitted to, either form of harassment described above, this is also harassment. In March 2021, a study by UN Women UK found that 97% of young women aged 18–24 have experienced some sexual harassment.

Sexual harassment is also now considered discrimination under the Equality Act 2010. The Equality Act 2010 consolidated over 116 separate pieces of legislation into a single act that protects citizens' rights and promotes equality for all. The new law strengthened the protection of individuals from discrimination in some areas. It is designed to protect individuals from discrimination based on age, disability, gender reassignment, marriage and civil partnership, pregnancy and maternity, race, religion or belief, sex, and sexual orientation. It covers a wide range of areas, including employment, education, housing, public accommodations, and the provision of goods and services. Under the Equality Act 2010, it is unlawful to discriminate against someone based on any of these protected characteristics. This includes direct discrimination, indirect discrimination, harassment, and victimization. The Act also imposes a duty on public authorities, such as local councils and government departments, to consider the impact of their policies and decisions on people with protected characteristics, and to take steps to promote equality of opportunity and eliminate discrimination.

Although the 2010 Equality Act is in place, many are pushing the UK government to put even more policies in place to stop sexual harassment in the workplace. One group in particular, "This is Not Working", acts because, according to recent surveys done by the Women and Equalities Committee, workplace sexual harassment is still very prevalent, even with the current legislation. The movement pushes for even more employers to take responsibility and proactively prevent sexual harassment.

=== Asia ===
==== China ====
In China, the 2005 Law for the Protection of Women's Rights and Interests of the People's Republic of China states "sexual harassment against women is prohibited" although the law does not explicitly define what sexual harassment is.

Sexual harassment is still pervasive within Chinese culture. A 2018 survey of female journalists revealed that 80% had experienced unwanted behavior, and an online survey of college students from all 34 provinces the same year revealed that 75% of female students and 35% of male students had experienced sexual harassment.

==== Lebanon ====
As of 2020, it is estimated that one in four women in Lebanon have been subjected to some form of unsolicited sexual advance, ranging from verbal to physical. On 21 December 2020, the Lebanese Parliament passed a law criminalizing sexual harassment. There was no national legislation to directly criminalize sexual harassment before this, with draft laws being proposed several times without effect.

==== India ====
Sexual harassment in India is termed "Eve teasing" and is described as: unwelcome sexual gesture or behavior, whether directly or indirectly as sexually colored remarks; physical contact and advances; showing pornography; a demand or request for sexual favours; any other unwelcome physical, verbal or non-verbal conduct being sexual in nature or passing sexually offensive and unacceptable remarks. The critical factor is the unwelcomeness of the behavior, which makes the impact on the recipient more relevant than the perpetrator's intent. According to the Indian constitution, sexual harassment infringes the fundamental right of a woman to gender equality under Article 14 and her right to life and live with dignity under Article 21.

In 1997, the Supreme Court of India, in a Public Interest Litigation, defined sexual harassment at the workplace, preventive measures, and a redress mechanism. The judgment is popularly known as Vishaka Judgment. In April 2013, India enacted its own law on sexual harassment in the workplace—The Sexual Harassment of Women at Workplace (Prevention, Prohibition and Redressal) Act, 2013. Almost 16 years after the Supreme Court's landmark guidelines on preventing sexual harassment in the workplace (known as the "Vishaka Guidelines"), the Act has endorsed many of them. It is a step towards codifying gender equality. The Act is intended to cover all women employees, including those in the unorganized sector and domestic workers. The Indian law does not permit the victim or complainant to take assistance of a legal professional in the inquiry, however, in Arti Devi Vs Jawaharlal Nehru University, the High Court of Delhi permitted the complainant to avail the services of a counsel as her defence assistant.

The Act has identified sexual harassment as a violation of the fundamental rights of a woman to equality under articles 14 and 15 of the Constitution of India and her right to life and to live with dignity under article 21 of the Constitution; as well as the right to practice any profession or to carry on any occupation, trade or business which includes a right to a safe environment free from sexual harassment. The Act also states that protection against sexual harassment and the right to work with dignity are universally recognized human rights under international conventions and instruments, such as the Convention on the Elimination of all Forms of Discrimination against Women, which the Government of India ratified on 25 June 1993.

The Criminal Law (Amendment) Act, 2013 introduced changes to the Indian Penal Code, making sexual harassment an express offense under Section 354A, punishable with imprisonment for up to 3 years and/or a fine. The Amendment also introduced new sections making acts like disrobing a woman without consent, stalking, and sexual acts by a person in authority an offense.

==== Israel ====
The 1998 Israeli Sexual Harassment Law interprets sexual harassment broadly. It prohibits the behavior as a discriminatory practice, a restriction of liberty, an offense to human dignity, a violation of every person's right to elementary respect, and an infringement of the right to privacy. Additionally, the law prohibits intimidation or retaliation thus related to sexual harassment are defined by the law as "prejudicial treatment".

==== Japan ====
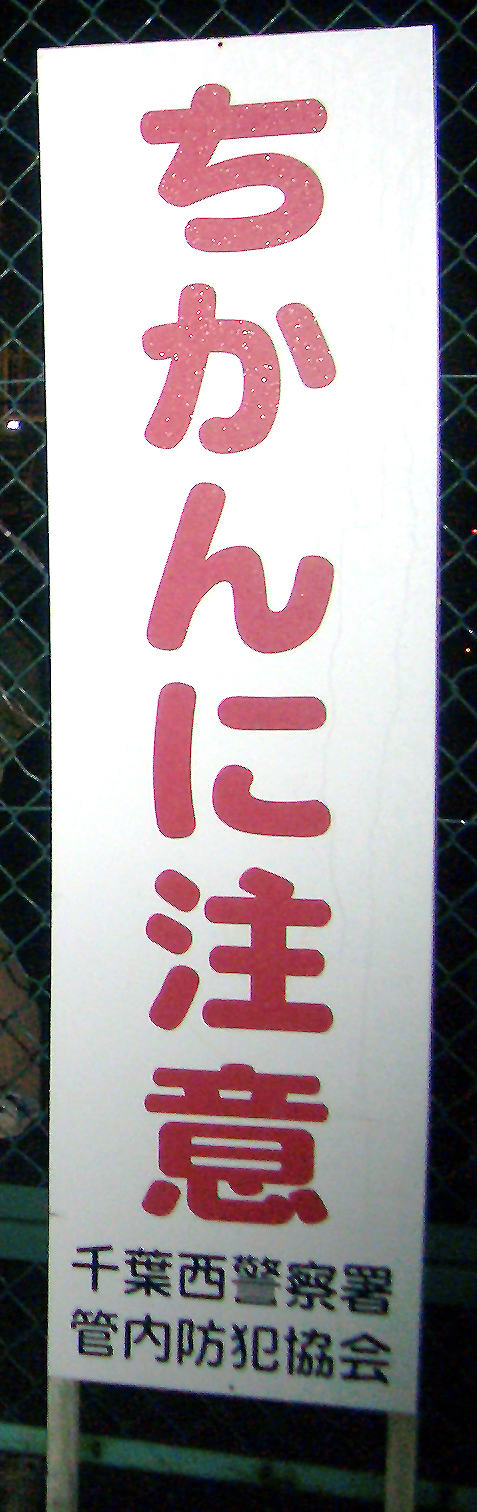
SexPublic sign in Chiba, Japan, warning of chikan

The Department of Labor received 11,289 consultations regarding sexual harassment (approximately 60% from female workers, 5% from male workers, and 35% from others) in 2014. However, given the generally low rate of reported sexual offenders (about 10%), the dark figure of sexual harassers is believed to be substantial, with 34.7% of full-time employees experiencing sexual harassment, according to the Japan Institute for Labor Policy and Training.

It appeared most dramatically in Japanese discourse in 1989, when a court case in Fukuoka ruled in favor of a woman who had been subjected to the spreading of sexual rumors by a co-worker. When the case was first reported, it spawned a flurry of public interest: 10 books were published, including English-language feminist guidebooks to 'how not to harass women' texts for men. Sekuhara was named 1989's 'Word of the Year'. The case was resolved in the victim's favor in 1992, awarding her about $13,000 in damages, the first sexual harassment lawsuit in Japanese history. Laws then established two forms of sexual harassment: taika-gata, in which rewards or penalties are explicitly linked to sexual acts, and kankyo-gata, in which the environment is made unpleasant through sexual talk or jokes, touching, or hanging sexually explicit posters. This applies to everyone in an office, including customers.

==== Malaysia ====
In Malaysia, sexual harassment as defined by the Employment Act 1955, is "any unwanted conduct of a sexual nature, whether verbal, non-verbal, visual, gestural or physical, directed at a person which is offensive, humiliating or a threat to their well-being". The Act does not distinguish between males and females or between employers and employees. As such, sexual harassment can be committed by a female against a male, or an employee against an employer.

Sexual harassment is common, and since 2010, trains on the Malaysian Railway have included pink-colored women-only cars as a means of cutting down on it. There are also women-only buses in Kuala Lumpur since 2010. In 2011, the government launched a women-only taxi service in the greater Kuala Lumpur area. The taxis have women drivers, and operate on an on-call basis.

==== New Zealand ====
In 2018, Statistics New Zealand published the findings of the Survey of Working Life, which queried employed individuals about their work schedules, employment circumstances, and levels of job satisfaction and work-life balance. 9% of males and 14% of women reported having dealt with bullying, harassment, or discrimination at work in the preceding year. Any invitation for sexual activity, whether direct or indirect, is considered sexual harassment according to the Employment Relations Act of 2000. The individual harassing the victim may be a boss, an employee, a volunteer, a coworker, an employer's representative, or even a customer, contractor, or supplier who is not an employee.

Health and Safety at Work Act 2015, the duties of PCBU (person undertaking a business or undertaking) are according to the act 36, subpart 2, Duties of PCBU are

· "The provision and maintenance of a work environment that is without risks to health and safety"; and

· "The provision and maintenance of safe plant and structures"; and

· "The provision and maintenance of safe systems of work"; and

· "The safe use, handling, and storage of plants, substances, and structures".

As per the Employment Relations Act 2000, you can file a personal grievance. A worker may file a personal grievance against their employer. You have 12 months from the date when the assault happened or became aware of your knowledge, whichever comes first.

Employment Relations (Extended Time for Personal Grievance for Sexual Harassment) Amendment Act 2023 and, section 54 amended states, an explanation in simple terms of the resources that are available for resolving issues with relationships at work, in relation to the 12-month period that must pass before filing a personal grievance under section 114(1) if the grievance relates to sexual harassment under section 103(1)(d).

Human Rights Act 1993 under 62 sexual harassment states that, in the course of engaging in any of the activities covered by the provisions of subsection (3), it is illegal for anyone to ask another person for sexual relations, sexual contact, or any other type of sexual activity when doing so contains an implicit or overt guarantee of favorable treatment. During one's engagement in each of the areas where subsection (3) applies, it is forbidden for an individual to subject another individual to the conduct of the actions that follow:

(a) a conduct that is unwanted or offensive to that individual (regardless of whether that is communicated to the first-mentioned individual); and

(b) an act that is either repeated or of a significant nature as to negatively impact that individual in relation to any of the regions where subsection (3) applies.

==== Pakistan ====
Pakistan introduced the Protection Against Harassment of Women at the Workplace Act in 2010. This law defines the act of harassment as. "[A]ny unwelcome sexual advance, request for sexual favors or other verbal or written communication or physical conduct of a sexual nature or sexually demeaning attitude, causing interference with work performance or creating an intimidating, hostile or offensive work environment, or the attempt to punish the complainant for refusal to such a request or is made a condition for employment".

The Protection Against Harassment of Women at the Workplace Act, 2010, was the first legislative measure in South Asia specifically enacted to address sexual harassment in professional environments. The Act was designed, drafted, and advocated by the civil society network AASHA (Alliance Against Sexual Harassment, which played a central role in its development. Simultaneously, a companion amendment to Section 509 of the Pakistan Penal Code (Act XLV 1860) and the Code of Criminal Procedure 1898 (Act V of 1898) Section 509 was passed and signed. While the Protection Act established internal mechanisms within organizations for the review and resolution of harassment complaintants' sexual harassment law, the Penal Code amendment extended the scope of legal recourse by allowing individuals to file harassment complaints nationwide, mandating police registration of such cases.

Following presidential assent on 8 March 2010, Prime Minister Yousaf Raza Gilani constituted the National Implementation Watch Committee ^{[1]} to oversee the enforcement of the Act. Dr. Fouzia Saeed, a founding member of AASHA, was appointed Chairperson of the committee. The implementation rules were formally published in The Gazette of Pakistan on 15 January 2011, marking the beginning of nationwide enforcement.

The legislative process leading to the enactment of the Act spanned a decade and has been documented extensively. Subsequent efforts to amend the Act, both successful and unsuccessful, have also been recorded. A comprehensive review of the Act's implementation over the following ten years was published by Mehergarh, authored by Maliha Husain, highlighting both achievements and ongoing challenges.

==== Philippines ====
The Anti-Sexual Harassment Act of 1995 was enacted:

primarily to protect and respect the dignity of workers, employees, and applicants for employment as well as students in educational institutions or training centers. This law, consisting of ten sections, provides for a clear definition of work, education or training-related sexual harassment and specifies the acts constituting sexual harassment. It likewise provides for the duties and liabilities of the employer in cases of sexual harassment, and sets penalties for violations of its provisions. A victim of sexual harassment is not barred from filing a separate and independent action for damages and other relief aside from filing the charge for sexual harassment.

Assistant Solicitor General Derek Puertollano was dismissed from service over 3 administrative charges for violations of RA 7877, "The Anti-Sexual Harassment Act of 1995", filed by a complaint from his legal interns. He was convicted of the grave offense of sexual harassment through unwanted touching of the private part of the body, and the less grave offenses of sexual harassment through unwanted touching or brushing against a victim's body, and through surreptitiously looking at a person's private part. "These harrowing incidents left complainants traumatized, scarring them both for life," said Lucas Bersamin in his decision dated 20 February 2024. Menardo Guevarra appointed an OIC to the vacated legal division.

=== United States ===
==== Evolution of sexual harassment law ====
===== Workplace =====
In the United States, the Civil Rights Act of 1964 prohibits employment discrimination based on race, sex, color, national origin or religion. 42 U.S.C. § 2000e-2 was initially intended only to combat sexual harassment of women, but the prohibition on sex discrimination covers both men and women. This discrimination occurs when the sex of the worker is made a condition of employment (i.e., all female waitpersons or male carpenters) or where this is a job requirement that does not mention sex but ends up preventing many more persons of one sex than the other from the job (such as height and weight limits). This act only applies to employers with 15 or more employees.

Barnes v. Train (1974) is commonly viewed as the first sexual harassment case in America, even though the term "sexual harassment" was not used. In 1976, Williams v. Saxbe established sexual harassment as a form of sex discrimination when sexual advances by a male supervisor towards a female employee, if proven, would be deemed an artificial barrier to employment placed before one gender and not another. In 1980, the Equal Employment Opportunity Commission (EEOC) issued regulations defining sexual harassment and stating it was a form of sex discrimination prohibited by the Civil Rights Act of 1964. In the 1986 case of Meritor Savings Bank v. Vinson, the Supreme Court first recognized "sexual harassment" as a violation of Title VII, established the standards for analyzing whether the conduct was welcome; levels of employer liability, and that speech or conduct in itself can create a "hostile environment". This case filed by Mechelle Vinson ruled that the sexual conduct between the subordinate and supervisor could not be deemed voluntary due to the hierarchical relationship between the two positions in the workplace. Following the ruling in Meritor Savings Bank v. Vinson, reported sexual harassment cases grew from 10 cases being registered by the EEOC per year before 1986 to 624 case being reported in the subsequent following year. This number of reported cases to the EEOC rose to 2,217 in 1990 and then 4,626 by 1995.

The Civil Rights Act of 1991 added provisions to Title VII protections including expanding the rights of women to sue and collect compensatory and punitive damages for sexual discrimination or harassment; the case of Ellison v. Brady (US Court of Appeals for the Ninth Circuit – 924 F.2d 872 (9th Cir. 1991)) resulted in rejecting the reasonable person standard in favor of the "reasonable woman standard" which allowed for cases to be analyzed from the perspective of the complainant and not the defendant. However, some legal scholars have argued this does not go far enough and that the reasonable person standard also needs to take intersectionality into account. Also in 1991, Jenson v. Eveleth Taconite Co. became the first sexual harassment case to be given class action status paving the way for others. Seven years later, in 1998, through that same case, new precedents were established that increased the limits on the "discovery" process in sexual harassment cases, which then allowed psychological injuries from the litigation process to be included in assessing damages awards. In the same year, the courts concluded in Faragher v. City of Boca Raton, Florida, and Burlington v. Ellerth, that employers are liable for harassment by their employees. Moreover, Oncale v. Sundowner Offshore Services set the precedent for same-sex harassment, and sexual harassment without motivation of "sexual desire", stating that any discrimination based on sex is actionable so long as it places the victim in an objectively disadvantageous working condition, regardless of the gender of either the victim, or the harasser.

In the 2006 case of Burlington Northern & Santa Fe Railway Co. v. White, the standard for retaliation against a sexual harassment complainant was revised to include any adverse employment decision or treatment that would be likely to dissuade a "reasonable worker" from making or supporting a charge of discrimination.

During 2007 alone, the U.S. Equal Employment Opportunity Commission and related state agencies received 12,510 new charges of sexual harassment on the job. In Astra USA v. Bildman, 914 N.E.2d 36 (Mass. 2009), applying New York's faithless servant doctrine, the court held that a company's employee who had engaged in financial misdeeds and sexual harassment must "forfeit all of his salary and bonuses for the period of disloyalty". The court held that this was the case even if the employee "otherwise performed valuable services", and that the employee was not entitled to recover restitution for the value of those other services.

The 2010 case, Reeves v. C.H. Robinson Worldwide, Inc. ruled that a hostile work environment can be created in a workplace where sexually explicit language and pornography are present. A hostile workplace may exist even if it is not targeted at any particular employee.

From 2010 through 2016, approximately 17% of sexual harassment complaints filed with the EEOC were made by men.

===== Education =====
Title IX of the Education Amendments of 1972 (United States) states, "No person in the United States shall, on the basis of sex, be excluded from participation in, be denied the benefits of, or be subjected to discrimination under any education program or activity receiving Federal financial assistance."

In Franklin v. Gwinnett County Public Schools (1992), the U.S. Supreme Court held that private citizens could collect damage awards when teachers sexually harassed their students. In Bethel School District No. 403 v. Fraser (1986), the courts ruled that schools have the power to discipline students if they use "obscene, profane language or gestures" which could be viewed as substantially interfering with the educational process, and inconsistent with the "fundamental values of public school education". Under regulations issued in 1997 by the U.S. Department of Education, which administers Title IX, school districts should be held responsible for harassment by educators if the harasser "was aided in carrying out the sexual harassment of students by his or her position of authority with the institution". In Davis v. Monroe County Board of Education, and Murrell v. School Dist. No. 1, 1999, schools were assigned liability for peer-to-peer sexual harassment if the plaintiff sufficiently demonstrated that the administration's response showed "deliberate indifference" to "actual knowledge" of discrimination.

==== Additionally ====
There are some legal options for a complainant in the U.S.: mediation, filing with the EEOC or filing a claim under a state Fair Employment Practices (FEP) statute (both are for workplace sexual harassment), filing a common law tort, etc. Not all sexual harassment will be considered severe enough to form the basis for a legal claim. However, most often, several types of harassing behavior are present, and there is no minimum level of harassing conduct under the law. The section below "EEOC Definition" describes the legal definitions that have been created for sexual harassment in the workplace. Definitions similar to the EEOC definition have been created for academic environments in the U.S. Department of Education Sexual Harassment Guidance.

==== EEOC Definition ====
The Equal Employment Opportunity Commission claims that it is unlawful to harass an applicant or employee of any sex in the workplace. The harassment could include sexual harassment. The EEOC says that the victim and harasser could be any gender and that the other does not have to be of the opposite sex. The law does not ban offhand comments, simple teasing, or minor incidents. If the harassment reaches the point of creating a hostile work environment, it will be addressed. In 1980, the Equal Employment Opportunity Commission produced a set of guidelines for defining and enforcing Title VII (in 1984 it was expanded to include educational institutions). The EEOC defines sexual harassment as:

Unwelcome sexual advances, requests for sexual favors, or other verbal or physical conduct of a sexual nature when:

1. Submission to such conduct was made either explicitly or implicitly a term or condition of an individual's employment,
2. Submission to or rejection of such conduct by an individual was used as the basis for employment decisions affecting such individual, or
3. Such conduct has the purpose or effect of unreasonably interfering with an individual's work performance or creating an intimidating, hostile, or offensive working environment.

Types 1 and 2 are called "quid pro quo" (Latin for "this for that" or "something for something"). They are essentially "sexual bribery", or the promise of benefits, and "sexual coercion".

Type 3, known as "hostile work environment", is by far the most common form. This form is less clear-cut and is more subjective.

Note: A workplace harassment complainant must file with the EEOC and receive a "right to sue" clearance, before they can file a lawsuit against a company in federal court.

===== Quid pro quo sexual harassment =====
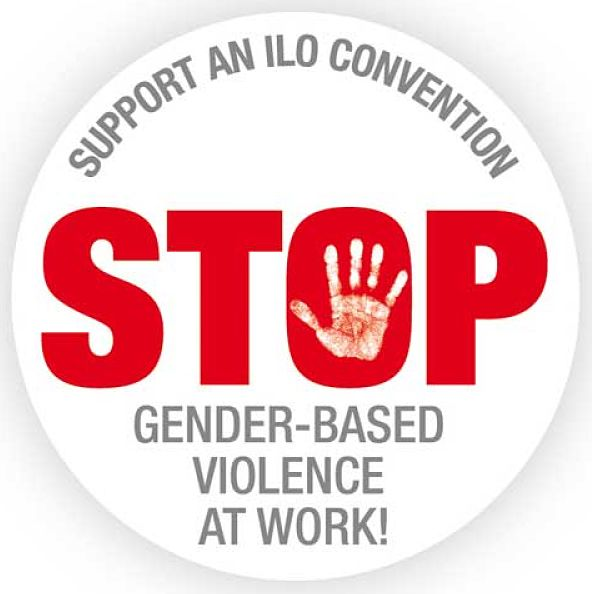
International Trade Union Confederation (2015–2017)

Quid pro quo means "this for that". In the workplace, this occurs when a job benefit is directly tied to an employee submitting to unwelcome sexual advances. For example, a supervisor promises an employee a raise if he or she will go out on a date with him or her, or tells an employee he or she will be fired if he or she does not sleep with him or her. Quid pro quo harassment also occurs when an employee makes an evaluative decision, or provides or withholds professional opportunities based on another employee's submission to verbal, nonverbal, or physical conduct of a sexual nature. Quid pro quo harassment is equally unlawful whether the victim resists and suffers the threatened harm or submits and thus avoids it.

===== Hostile environment sexual harassment =====
This occurs when an employee is subjected to comments of a sexual nature, unwelcome physical contact, or offensive sexual materials as a regular part of the work environment. For the most part, a single isolated incident will not be enough to prove hostile environment harassment unless it involves extremely outrageous and egregious conduct. The courts will try to decide whether the conduct is both "serious" and "frequent". Supervisors, managers, co-workers, and even customers can be responsible for creating a hostile environment.

The line between "quid pro quo" and "hostile environment" harassment is not always clear, and the two forms of harassment often occur together. For example, an employee's job conditions are affected when a sexually hostile work environment results in constructive discharge. At the same time, a supervisor who makes sexual advances toward a subordinate employee may communicate an implicit threat to retaliate against her if she does not comply.

"Hostile environment" harassment may acquire characteristics of "quid pro quo" harassment if the offending supervisor abuses his authority over employment decisions to force the victim to endure or participate in the sexual conduct. Sexual harassment may culminate in a retaliatory discharge if a victim tells the harasser or her employer she will no longer submit to the harassment, and is then fired in retaliation for this protest. Under these circumstances it would be appropriate to conclude that both harassment and retaliation in violation of section 704(a) of Title VII have occurred.

===== Sexual orientation discrimination =====
In the United States, there are no federal laws prohibiting discrimination against employees based on their sexual orientation. However, Executive Order 13087, signed by President Bill Clinton, outlaws discrimination based on sexual orientation against federal government employees. If a small business owner operates in a state with a law against sexual orientation discrimination, the owner must abide by that law, even if there is no federal law. Twenty states and the District of Columbia have laws against this form of workplace discrimination. These states include California, Connecticut, Colorado, Hawaii, Illinois, Iowa, Maine, Maryland, Massachusetts, Minnesota, Nevada, New Hampshire, New Jersey, New Mexico, New York, Oregon, Rhode Island, Vermont, Washington, and Wisconsin. For example, California has laws in place to protect employees who may have been discriminated against based upon sexual orientation or perceived sexual orientation. California law prohibits discrimination against those "with traits not stereotypically associated with their gender", such as mannerisms, appearance, or speech. Sexual orientation discrimination comes up, for instance, when employers enforce a dress code, permit women to wear makeup but not men, or require men and women only to use restrooms designated for their particular sex, regardless of whether they are transgender.

===== Retaliation =====
Retaliation has occurred when an employee suffers a negative action after reporting sexual harassment, filing a grievance, assisting someone else with a complaint, or participating in discrimination-prevention activities. Negative actions can include being fired, demotion, suspension, denial of promotion, poor evaluation, unfavorable job reassignment—any adverse employment decision or treatment that would be likely to dissuade a "reasonable worker" from making or supporting a charge of discrimination. (See Burlington Northern & Santa Fe Railway Co. v. White.) Retaliation is as illegal as the sexual harassment itself, but also as difficult to prove. Also, retaliation is illegal even if the original charge of sexual harassment was not proven.

===== New Jersey =====
New Jersey was historically known to have one of the strongest anti-sexual harassment laws in the United States. The Law Against Discrimination used to hold an employer liable if the sexual harassment was done by a member of upper-level management. In 2015, the New Jersey Supreme Court modified the precedent in the State of New Jersey and prevented the company from being liable if they had a well-published and enforced anti-harassment policy. Accordingly, if a policy existed and were enforced, the victim or witness to the sexual harassment would need to report the conduct. The company would not be liable if it investigates the matter and takes remedial measures to ensure that the harassment stops. The company is liable only if the activity occurs again. (See Aguas v. NJ.)

===== Military =====
In January 2022, sexual harassment was made illegal under U.S. military law under an executive order by president Joe Biden.

== Criticism ==
Though the phrase sexual harassment is generally acknowledged to include clearly damaging and morally deplorable behavior, its boundaries can be broad and controversial. Accordingly, misunderstandings can occur. In the US, sexual harassment law has been criticized by persons such as the criminal defense lawyer Alan Dershowitz and the legal writer and libertarian Eugene Volokh, for imposing limits on the right to free speech.

Jana Rave, professor in organizational studies at the Queen's School of Business, criticized sexual harassment policy in the Ottawa Business Journal as helping maintain archaic stereotypes of women as "delicate, asexual creatures" who require special protection, while at the same time, complaints are lowering company profits. Camille Paglia says that young girls can end up acting in such ways as to make sexual harassment easier, such that for example, by acting "nice" they can become a target. Paglia commented in an interview with Playboy, "Realize the degree to which your niceness may invoke people to say lewd and pornographic things to you—sometimes to violate your niceness. The more you blush, the more people want to do it."

Other critics assert that sexual harassment is a very serious problem, but current views focus too heavily on sexuality rather than on the type of conduct that undermines the ability of women or men to work together effectively. Viki Shultz, a law professor at Yale University, comments, "Many of the most prevalent forms of harassment are designed to maintain work—particularly the more highly rewarded lines of work—as bastions of male competence and authority." Feminist Jane Gallop sees this evolution of the definition of sexual harassment as coming from a "split" between what she calls "power feminists" who are pro-sex (like herself) and what she calls "victim feminists", who are not. She argues that the split has helped lead to a perversion of the definition of sexual harassment, which used to be about sexism but has come to be about anything that is sexual.

There is also concern over abuses of sexual harassment policy by individuals as well as by employers and administrators using false or frivolous accusations as a way of expelling employees they want to eliminate for other reasons. These employees often have virtually no recourse under the at-will employment law in most US states.

O'Donohue and Bowers outlined 14 possible pathways to false allegations of sexual harassment: "lying, borderline personality disorder, histrionic personality disorder, psychosis, gender prejudice, substance abuse, dementia, false memories, false interpretations, biased interviews, sociopathy, personality disorders not otherwise specified".

There is also discussion of whether some recent trends towards more revealing clothing and permissive habits have created a more sexualized general environment, in which some forms of communication are unfairly labeled harassment, but are simply a reaction to greater sexualization in everyday environments.

There are many debates about how organizations should deal with sexual harassment. Some observers feel strongly that organizations should be held to a zero tolerance standard of "Must report—must investigate—must punish."

Others write that those who feel harassed should, in most circumstances, have a choice of options.

Sexual harassment laws may also be unfairly applied in effect. Unsolicited sexual advances were considered more disturbing and more discomforting when perpetrated by an unattractive opposite sex colleague than when perpetrated by an attractive opposite sex colleague.

=== Manifesto by Catherine Deneuve and other writers ===
In January 2018, Catherine Deneuve, along with 99 other French women writers, performers, and academics, signed an open letter that argued the #MeToo movement had gone too far, turning into a "witch hunt", and denounced it as a form of puritanism, resulting in a backlash. Though she later apologized to all the victims who felt offended by the letter, she defended her involvement by saying there was "nothing in the letter" to Le Monde that said "anything good about harassment, otherwise [she] wouldn't have signed it".

== In media and literature ==
- 678, a film focusing on the sexual harassment of women in Egypt
- 9 to 5, a comedy film starring Jane Fonda, Lily Tomlin, and Dolly Parton, about three women who are subjected to constant bullying and sexual harassment by their boss.
- In the pilot episode of the American comedy series Ally McBeal, Ally leaves her job at her first firm because of unwanted attention from and groping by a male co-worker.
- The Ballad of Little Jo, a film based on the true story of a woman living in the frontier west who disguises herself as a man to protect herself from the sexual harassment and abuse of women all too common in that environment
- Bombshell, a 2019 film based upon the accounts of the women at Fox News who set out to expose CEO Roger Ailes for sexual harassment.
- Disclosure, a film starring Michael Douglas and Demi Moore in which a man is sexually harassed by his female superior, who tries to use the situation to destroy his career by claiming that he was the sexual harasser
- Disgrace, a novel about a South African literature professor whose career is ruined after he has an affair with a student.
- The Fox television musical-drama show Glee deals with issues around sexual harassment in the episodes "The Power of Madonna", "Never Been Kissed", and "The First Time".
- Hostile Advances: The Kerry Ellison Story: television movie about Ellison v. Brady, the case that set the "reasonable woman" precedent in sexual harassment law
- The 1961 musical How to Succeed in Business Without Really Trying deals with themes of both consensual office romance and unwelcome sexual harassment; one man is fired for making a pass at the wrong woman, and another man is warned via a song called "A Secretary is Not a Toy".
- Hunter's Moon, a novel by Karen Robards, deals with a female's experience of sexual harassment in the workplace.
- In the Company of Men, a film about two male coworkers who, angry at women, plot to seduce and maliciously toy with the emotions of a deaf subordinate who works at the same company
- The AMC television drama show Mad Men, set in the 1960s, depicts sexual harassment and coercive behavior.
- The Magdalene Sisters, a film based on the true stories of young women imprisoned for "bringing shame upon their families" by being raped, sexually abused, flirting, or simply being pretty, and subsequently subjected to sexual harassment and abuse by the nuns and priests in the Magdalene asylums in Ireland.
- Les Misérables, a musical based on the novel by Victor Hugo. The character Fantine is fired from her job after refusing to have sex with her supervisor.
- North Country, a 2005 film depicting a fictionalized account of Jenson v. Eveleth Taconite Co., the first sexual harassment class action lawsuit in the US.
- Oleanna, an American play by David Mamet, later a film starring William H. Macy. A college professor is accused of sexual harassment by a student. The film deals with the moral controversy as it never becomes clear which character is correct.
- Pretty Persuasion, a film starring Evan Rachel Wood and James Woods in which students turn the tables on a lecherous and bigoted teacher. A scathingly satirical film of sexual harassment and discrimination in schools, and attitudes towards females in the media and society.
- War Zone, a documentary about street harassment
- Commander Jeffrey Gordon, a military spokesman at Guantanamo Bay, complained that a reporter had been sexually harassing him.

== See also ==
- Sexual harassment in education
- Disciplinary counseling
- Initiatives to prevent sexual violence
- London Anti-Street Harassment campaign
- Love contract
- Job interview
- Microinequity
- Misogyny
- Mass sexual assault
- #MeToo
- Occupational health psychology
- Operation Anti Sexual Harassment
- Patriarchy
- Psychological stress
- Sexism
- Sextortion
- Sexual bullying
- Sexual harassment in the military
- Sexual harassment in the workplace in the United States
- Til It Happens To You
- Transphobia
- Workplace bullying
- Workplace harassment
- Workplace stress
