= WWU =

WWU may refer to:

- University of Münster (Westphalian Wilhelms-University Münster), in Germany
- Walla Walla University, in Washington, U.S.
- Warehouse Workers United
- Western Washington University, in Washington, U.S.
- Wiki Workers United, a union formed within the Wikimedia Foundation's former Community Tech team
- William Woods University, in Missouri, U.S.
- Working Women United, a women's rights organisation
