= Wiki Workers United =

Union involving Wikimedia Foundation

- Wiki Workers United logo
- Founded: September 2026; 2 months ago
- Type: Trade union
- Locations: United States; United Kingdom
- Website: wikiworkersunited.org

Wiki Workers United is a trade union for the employees of the Wikimedia Foundation (WMF). It was formed in early 2026.

The WMF did not voluntarily recognise the union in either the US or UK, and hired law firm Littler Mendelson to advise WMF during the unionisation vote called by Wiki Workers United and the Communications Workers of America (CWU). Wikimedia volunteers criticised the WMF's actions.

In September 2026, US employees of the Wikimedia Foundation elected a union, with the support of the Communications Workers of America.

Wikimedia Deutschland (WMDE) employees elected a works council in 2014, which as of 2026 has 7 members and has not concluded any collective agreement.

== Background ==
Wiki Workers United formed in early 2026. In May of that year, WMF disbanded the Community Tech team, shortly after the dismissal of prominent union-supporter Brooke Vibber, one of the architects of the MediaWiki software.

The Wikimedia Foundation, Inc. is an American nonprofit organisation headquartered in San Francisco, California that employs 700 workers in 44 countries. It is most known for hosting Wikipedia, one of the world's most visited websites. It also hosts 14 related open collaboration projects, and supports the development of MediaWiki, the wiki software that underpins them all. As of June 2022 the WMF reported $239 million in net assets. It was expected to raise $174 million in revenue in the 2023/2024 fiscal year.

=== German labour law ===
German labour representation has a dual structure of trade unions and works councils. Trade unions like ver.di negotiate collective agreements with individual employers and regional collective agreements with employers associations (e.g. retail or non-profit sector). Works councils are made up of elected employees in the workplace. They negotiate works agreements and have various co-determination, participation and information rights. In theory works councils do not overlap with collective bargaining regarding wage adjustments. Formally separate structures, many works council members are de-facto union representatives.

=== United Kingdom labour law ===
Statutory trade union recognition in United Kingdom labour law is governed by Schedule A1 of the Trade Union and Labour Relations (Consolidation) Act 1992, amended by the Employment Relations Act 1999. Any union can initiate the statutory recognition process by the Central Arbitration Committee (CAC), when it has at least 10% union density (ratio of union to non union members) within the proposed bargaining unit. When a majority of the bargaining unit are members, the CAC can automatically recognise the union, otherwise it is determined in a ballot election process.

=== United States labour law ===
Employer opposition to unions has been common in the United States since the 19th century. In cases of illegal interference, such as unfair labour practices, the National Labor Relations Board (NLRB) has limited mechanisms to enforce the law under the National Labor Relations Act – which codifies worker rights. Unlike the Occupational Safety and Health Administration, the NLRB cannot impose fines. Employees in a workplace can form a union if a majority sign union cards or vote in a supervised election. Union density (the ratio of union to non-union workers) was low in the US in the early 2020s. Several union actions in 2023 attracted public interest. According to labour sociologist Joshua Mayor, unionisation efforts sometimes fail not because workers are against unions, but because workers do not believe they can win.

== Germany ==
Wikimedia Deutschland (WMDE) was established in 2004 as a non-profit in Germany. It is principally responsible for the development of Wikidata. According to its records in 2025, it had over 110,000 dues-paying members and employed around 180 people, working on projects ranging from public relations to technical development of Wikidata to community support for contributors to Wikipedia and sister projects. It has its own fundraising team and is supported in part by dues from its membership.

In 2014, WMDE employees elected a works council which has 7-employee representatives as of 2026. The works council has negotiated works agreements covering topics like salary guideline structures (but not the actual amounts, which is reserved right of trade unions) and sick leave reintegration plans and mobile work. WMDE has not concluded any collective agreement with a trade union, so employees are not covered by any collective agreement coverage.

In a joint statement published on 3 September 2026, the executive director and the works council explained the benefits of employee representative structures, including transparency, identifying problems early on and that competing interests of the employer/employee are normal and solvable. It echoed concerns about the choice of WMF to retain law firm Littler Mendelson given its reputation for union busting, at the union drives in the United States and United Kingdom.

== United Kingdom ==
On 24 June, United Kingdom WMF employees were the first country-based group to seek union recognition under the Wiki Workers United (WWU) umbrella, with the support of the Communication Workers Union. The UK has the second highest number of staff after the United States.

Communication Workers Union sent a letter for voluntary recognition to the employer, which is SafeGuard (an employer of record) on behalf of Wikimedia Foundation. The employer declined to recognise, but agreed to negotiate the scope of the bargaining unit and conditions around it.

On 7 August, CWU petitioned the Central Arbitration Committee (CAC) to begin the statutory union recognition process. Acas provided formal mediation to resolve differences around bargaining unit eligibility. On 4 September, CAC confirmed that out of the 45-proposed employee bargaining unit, 26 employees were union members of CWU, well over the 10% minimum threshold, and potentially enough for union recognition without requiring a ballot election.

== United States ==
People supporting a Wiki Workers United union at Wikimania 2026

Bernadette Meehan answers question on Wiki Workers United US's request for voluntary recognition at Wikimania 2026

Number of signers of the petition over time

In July, a month after the United Kingdom's public launch, United States (US) staff launched their own voluntary union recognition from WMF. The labour union is supported by the Communications Workers of America.

By 24 July, over 1,190 volunteer editors had signed a petition, pledging to go on a solidarity strike, should Wiki Workers United call for one. Tactics discussed for a possible volunteer editor strike ranged from blocking donation banners to limiting editorial maintenance by not removing spam and ordinary vandalism.

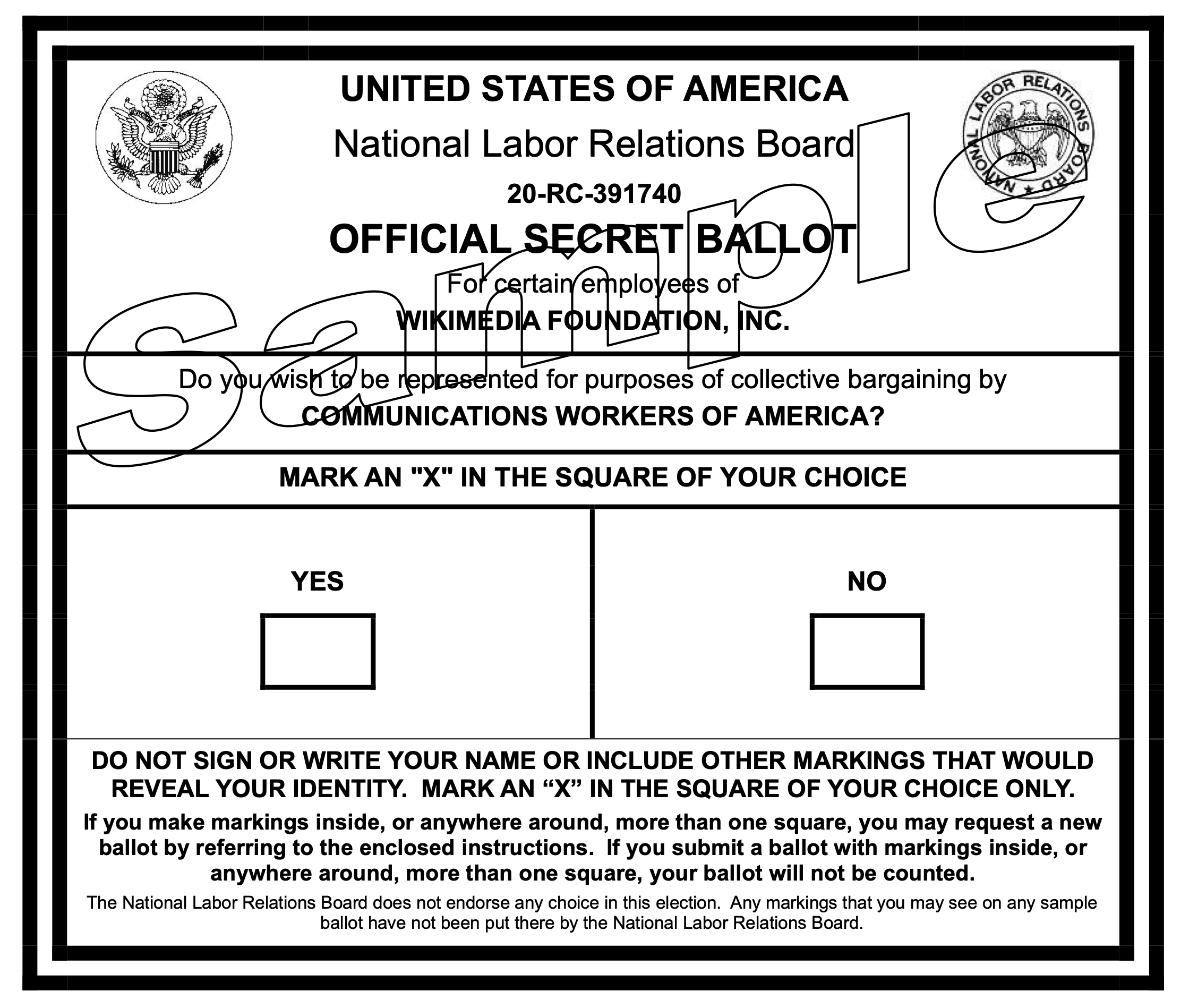
Sample ballot sent by the NLRB ahead of the election

On 27 July, WMF stated that it would not voluntarily recognise the United States union. It stated that the union would need to pursue a formal National Labor Relations Board (NLRB) election procedure instead.

Accompanying its announcement, WMF published an FAQ stating that it had heard dissenting voices and referred to benefits already provided to employees. According to Der Standard, the talking point about existing employee benefits is common among anti-union employers. 404 Media noted that the statement used "very carefully-worded language common among companies and organisations that have fought against unionisation". According to Der Standard, Wikipedia community members were "extremely angry" (German: die Kommentatoren äußerst ungehalten) with WMF's 27 July statement.

On 28 July, WWU US stated that it had lodged a request for an NLRB ballot, alleging that WMF had used "typical union-busting tactics" and describing the WMF's use of resources as "insulting and expensive" by its hiring of the historically union-busting legal firm Littler Mendelson to represent it in the NLRB ballot.

On 3 September 2026, the WWU–US NLRB election was successful, with 158 of the 172 ballots cast supporting unionisation, to affiliate it with Communications Workers of America Local 9415. Both the union and Foundation stated that they would begin the collective bargaining process, which CEO Bernadette Meehan committed to negotiate "in good faith" for a "timely agreement". Primary motivations included hiring decisions and just cause termination.

== Reactions ==
The activities aimed at unionisation and the responses attracted international reporting. On 29 May 2026, the Polish tech media service Telepolis described the threatened strike as a "serious conflict" that could "significantly" lower Wikipedia's quality. LiFO saw the WMF's refusal of voluntary recognition as a paradox, in that "an institution based on the idea that communities know how to organise themselves" asked for the "will of its workers" to be assessed a "second, institutional" time. On 28 July, LiFO described the conflict as a question not solvable by "just a citation": "if knowledge is a public good, who has a say in how the work behind it is organised?" (Greek: αν η γνώση είναι κοινό αγαθό, ποιος έχει φωνή στον τρόπο που οργανώνεται η εργασία πίσω από αυτήν)

== See also ==
- Unionisation in the tech sector
- Amazon and trade unions
- Apple and unions
- Google and trade unions
- Meta and unions
- CODE-CWA
- Unionisation in the nonprofit sector
