= Meta and unions =

Meta and Facebook workers who formed unions

The social media platform Meta Platforms services 3 billion users across its subsidiaries Facebook, Instagram, Messenger, WhatsApp and Threads. Meta employs an estimated 60,000–80,000 employees as of 2023. Facebook subcontracts an additional estimated 15,000 content moderators around the world. The majority of unionized workers at Meta in the United States are subcontractors working as security guards, janitors, bus drivers and culinary staff. In Germany and Kenya, content moderators have formed unions and a works council in 2023.

== Germany ==
There are 5,000 content moderators in Germany employed by Telus International, Majorel and TikTok servicing different social media platforms including Facebook and Instagram.

Cengiz Haksöz is employed by Telus International, moderating content for Facebook and Instagram. Shortly after giving a testimony on June 27, 2023, to the German Bundestag Committee on Digitization regarding his working conditions, Haksöz was placed on paid-leave and banned from the company premises in Essen. The company alleges he violated his non-disclosure agreement. As the chair of electoral board, Haksöz is responsible for facilitating the works council election which was ongoing. Ver.di union filed an objection against management's obstruction to the election. The Essen Labour Court ruled in favor of Haksöz and ordered the company to let him return. The works council election commenced on July 7, with the union ver.di list receiving 80% of employee votes, or 14 of 17 seats on the works council.

== Ireland ==
Covalen content moderator and data annotators, who contract for Meta went on strikes in April and May 2026 after they were told that 700 positions would be cancelled. Covalen workers organized with support of Digital and Techworkers Alliance, a branch of Communication Workers Union. Unlike the United States or the United Kingdom, there is no threshold or obligation for Irish employers to recognize a workplace union. Covalen management has not recognized the union voted on by Covalen employees.

== Kenya ==
150 content moderators, who contract for Meta, ByteDance and OpenAI gathered in Nairobi, Kenya to launch the first African Content Moderators Union on May 1, 2023. This union was launched 4 years after Daniel Motaung was fired and retaliated against for organizing at Sama, which contracts for Facebook.

== United States ==
Meta employees are not unionized. Subcontractors indirectly employed by Meta including security guards, janitors, bus drivers and culinary staff are largely unionized. Previous efforts to unionize content moderators and mail room sorters were unsuccessful.

Culinary and cafeteria staff employed by FlagShip, serve Facebook offices in Menlo Park, Fremont, Seattle and New York City. At Facebook's headquarter in Menlo Park, 500 cafeteria workers voted to unionize with UNITE HERE union in 2017. Facebook contracts multiple IT outsourcing providers including Accenture, Cognizant, TaskUs, and Wipro to provide hundreds of content moderators within the United States. With the support of Campaign to Organize Digital Employees (Communications Workers of America), moderators at Wipro organized in 2020 for better working conditions including pay-parity with employees of Facebook. Workers left due to alleged retaliation. In the smallest NLRB election at Meta, 46 mail room sorters employed by Canon Production Printing (Canon Inc. subsidiary) voted in April 2022 whether to affiliate with Teamsters union. 46 workers voted, 23 in favor and 23 against. In October, the NLRB ruled that the election was not successful.
