= Unionization in the nonprofit sector =

Trade unions for nonprofit workers

A nonprofit workers union is a trade union for nonprofit workers, defined as those working for non-governmental, not for profit organizations.

The unionization of a nonprofit organization depends on the national labor organizing laws of the country the organization operates in. Depending on region, the nonprofit sector can also be referred to as the voluntary sector, the third sector, the community sector, the civic sector, and the social sector.

== Australia ==
As of the 2010s, Australian nonprofit employees are often covered by a ruling in Australian labour law called an award, in which case enterprise bargaining agreements are established in the award. In Australia, unions organize across an entire sector rather than forming separate unions for each employer. Nonprofit workers in many industries are represented by a number of established unions in Australia depending on the industry, including: Australian Services Union, Health Services Union, United Workers Union, Australian Nursing and Midwifery Federation, Independent Education Union of Australia.

== France ==
In France, a union named ASSO was created in february 2010 to defend nonprofit workers, affiliated to the Union syndicale Solidaires.

== United States ==
=== Brookings Institution ===
Brookings staff's union, Brookings United, was formed in 2021. It is affiliated with the Nonprofit Professional Employees Union (NPEU), a local of the International Federation of Professional and Technical Engineers. In 2024, the ratification of a 3-year collective bargaining agreement (CBA) was reached.

=== Code for America ===
In January 2021, Office and Professional Employees International Union (OPEIU) launched Tech Workers Union Local 1010 as a result of its success unionizing Kickstarter. In August, workers at the nonprofit organization, Code for America, went public with their union drive with OPEIU.

=== Electronic Freedom Foundation ===
In 2024, Electronic Frontier Foundation (EEF) employees joined the Engineers and Scientists of California Local 20, IFPTE. EFF Executive Director Cindy Cohn said in response to the unionization: "EFF is its people. From the moment that our staff decided to organize, we were supportive and approached these negotiations with a commitment to enshrining the best of our practices and adopting improvements through open and honest discussions.”

=== Planned Parenthood ===
The Planned Parenthood organizations that are unionized are done so regionally or by location. Since 2017, frontline Planned Parenthood staff have been publicly engaged in unionization campaigns at many Planned Parenthood locations. Workers have criticized the organization for its low salaries, poor working conditions and a disconnect between leadership and rank and file workers. Planned Parenthood Rocky Mountains challenged the results of its union election at the National Labor Relations Board and hired the Fisher Phillips lawfirm to run an anti-union campaign, before eventually agreeing to a contract in 2018. Planned Parenthood North Central States disciplined its union's entire bargaining team and fired a union organizer after she accused a coworker of assault. The regional affiliate agreed to a contract in 2023 after 37 bargaining sessions over the course of 16 months. Planned Parenthood Federation of America in Washington, D.C is represented by the SEIU Local 500.

=== Southern Poverty Law Center ===
In mid-December 2019, staff at the Southern Poverty Law Center voted to unionize, with 142 in favor and 45 against. The SPLC had "long been dogged by accusations of internal discrimination against minority employees, particularly in the area of promotions." However, in the fall of 2024, leadership at the SPLC laid off over 80 of their staff, prompting the SPLC Union to issue a no-confidence motion in the SPLC President and CEO at the time after members accused leadership of union-busting.

=== The Legal Aid Society ===
The Legal Aid Society is a 501(c)(3) non-profit law firm based in New York City. In 1969, he Association of Legal Aid Attorneys (ALAA) was established to represent the staff attorneys of The Legal Aid Society and remain the largest union of public defenders in the country. In 2026, non-attorney staff at The Legal Aid Society, unionized with the 1199SEIU United Healthcare Workers East, held a citywide picket demonstration calling on management to institute pay raises.

=== Urban Institute ===
In 2021, the Urban Institute Employees Union (UIEU) was formed and is affiliated with the Nonprofit Professional Employees Union (NPEU), a local of the International Federation of Professional and Technical Engineers. In 2024, ratification of the first collective bargaining agreement (CBA) was reached.

=== Wikimedia Foundation ===
A union of Wikimedia Foundation workers began formalizing in early 2026 under the Wiki Workers United name. On 24 June, United Kingdom WMF employees were the first country-based group to seek union recognition under the Wiki Workers United umbrella, with the support of the Communication Workers Union. The UK has the second highest number of staff, after the United States. A month later, the United States staff launched their own voluntary union recognition from WMF. The labor union is supported by the Communications Workers of America (CWA). Over 1,190 volunteer editors signed a petition, pledging to go on a solidarity strike, should Wiki Workers United call for one. On 27 July, WMF declined to voluntarily recognize the United States union. WMF stated that the union would need to pursue a formal National Labor Relations Board (NLRB) election procedure instead. 404 Media noted that the statement used "very carefully-worded language common among companies and organizations that have fought against unionization". On July 28, the NLRB process was registered, citing a Littler Mendelson representative for WMF and a Weinberg, Roger & Rosenfeld representative for CWA.

People supporting a Wiki Workers United union at Wikimania 2026.

=== Nonprofit Professional Employees Union (NPEU) ===
The Nonprofit Professional Employees Union (NPEU), IFPTE Local 70, represents employees of over 40 nonprofit organizations across the United States, including the American Civil Liberties Union (ACLU), Food & Water Watch, J Street, and the National Women's Law Center.

List of Unionized Nonprofit Organizations in the United States
Nonprofit Organization	Year union established	Union name	Affiliated with
American Civil Liberties Union	2021		NPEU
Animal Legal Defense Fund (ALDF)	2021	ALDF United	NPEU
Bend the Arc	2021		NPEU
Brookings Institution	2021	Brookings United	NPEU
Center on Budget and Policy Priorities (CBPP)	2018		NPEU
Code for America	2023	CfA Workers United	OPEIU
Electronic Frontier Foundation	2024		IFPTE
Every Texan	2020	Every Texan United	NPEU
Friends of the Earth (FOE)	2023	Friends of the Earth Workers United	NPEU
Jews United for Justice (JUFJ)	2019		NPEU
Jobs to Move America (JMA)	2020		NPEU
J Street	2020	J Street Workers Union	NPEU
Lawyers' Committee for Civil Rights Under Law	2020	LC United	NPEU
Maryland Center on Economic Policy (MDCEP)	2018		NPEU
National Immigration Law Center (NILC)	2024	NILC Union	NPEU
National Women's Law Center (NWLC)	2022	NWLC United	NPEU
Open Markets Institute (OMI)	2020	Union of Open Markets Staff	NPEU
Pew Research Center	2026	Pew Research Union	NPEU
Southern Poverty Law Center	2019	SPLC Union	WBNG
The Legal Aid Society	1969	LAS Attorneys United	ALAA Local 2325
Urban Institute	2021	Urban Institute Employees Union	NPEU

== See also ==
- Unionization in the tech sector
- Labor unions in the United States
- Public-sector trade unions in the United States
