= NLRB election procedures =

Procedures for gaining union recognition in the US

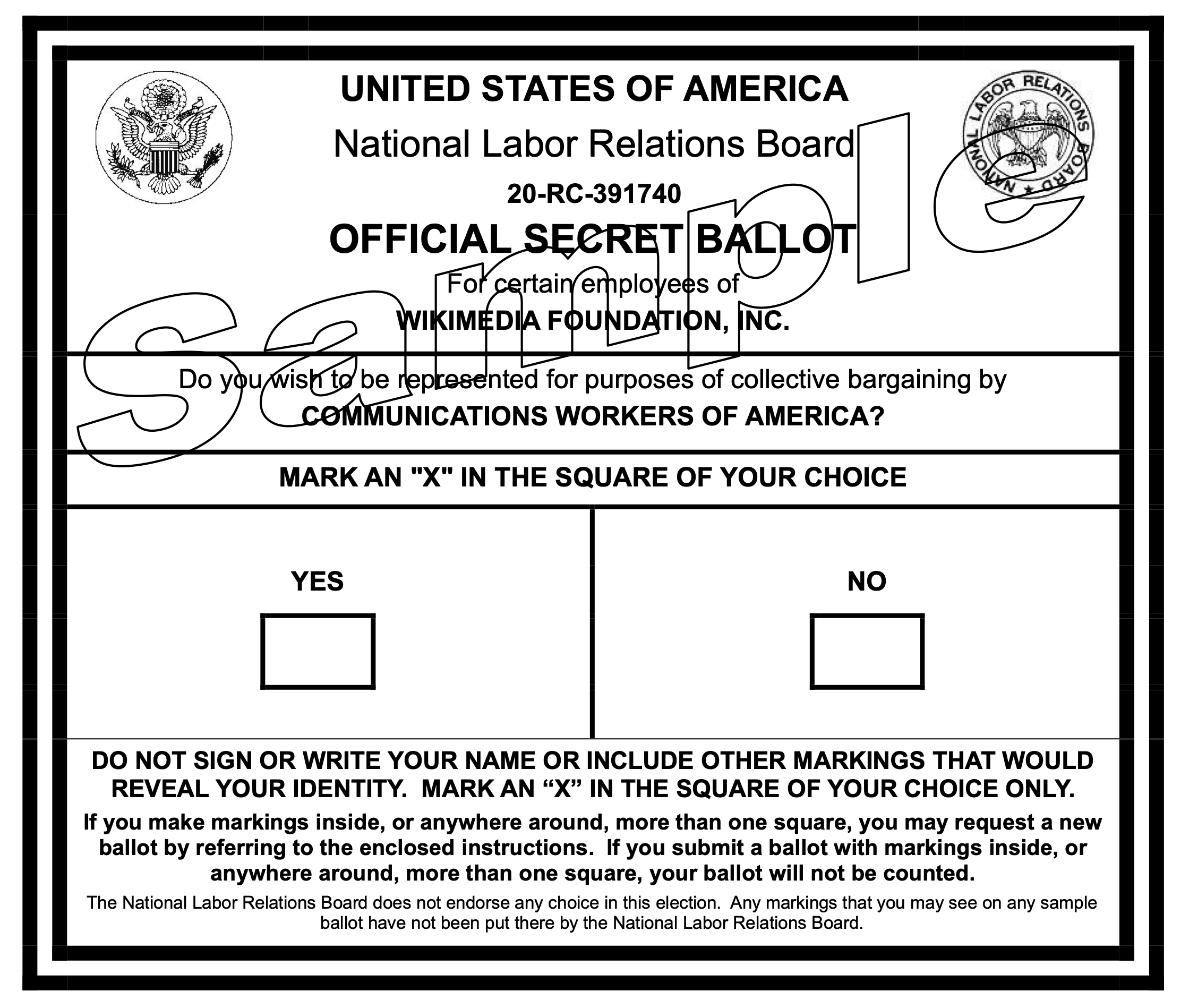
NLRB election ballot used for the Wikimedia union election

The National Labor Relations Board, an agency within the United States government, was created in 1935 as part of the National Labor Relations Act. Among the NLRB's chief responsibilities is the holding of elections to permit employees to vote whether they wish to be represented by a particular labor union. Congress amended the Act in 1947 through the Taft–Hartley Act to give workers the ability to decertify an already recognized or certified union as well. This article describes, in a very summary manner, the procedures that the NLRB uses to hold such elections, as well as the circumstances in which a union may obtain the right to represent a group of employees without an election.

== Obtaining authorization cards ==
To obtain an NLRB-conducted election, the union must file a petition supported by a showing of interest from at least thirty percent of the employees in the group that the union seeks to represent, typically called the bargaining unit. Unions typically use authorization cards, individual forms in which a worker states that they wish to be represented by the union, as evidence of employee support. A card or petition that simply states that the signer wanted an election would not be valid. Similarly if an employee signed the card because the union had told him that the only reason to sign the card was to have an election, the Board will not count that card. The Board also treats cards as invalid if they were obtained with illegal assistance from the employer: for example, if the employer gave the petitioning union access to its facility that it did not permit other unions or other organizations to have, or if it made threats or promises that coerced employees into signing these cards. Cards collected with the help of low level supervisors may also be "tainted", even if the employer is opposed to the union, depending on what the supervisor said or did and the nature of the employer's response. Some union promises, such as a promise to waive union initiation fees for employees who sign a card before a certain date, may also make an authorization card invalid.

== Petitioning for an election ==
When the union files its petition, the NLRB first checks the sufficiency of the union's showing of support. The Board will not show the cards to the employer, or release the names of the employees who have signed them, or indicate the number of cards submitted by the union.

The employer may, nonetheless, challenge this showing of interest by claiming that the signatures on the cards are not genuine, or that they have been tainted by supervisory involvement in the union's campaign, or that the union has understated the number of employees in the unit that it seeks to represent. Then the Board will conduct an administrative investigation into those allegations. If the Board finds that any of these cards are invalid for any reason it will typically allow the union a brief period of time to submit however many cards are necessary to meet its thirty percent standard.

Optionally, a union that has gained over 50% of employees petitioning for representation can form by card check election. An employer currently can refuse to accept the results of a card check election and require a secret ballot election. Under the proposed Employee Free Choice Act an employer challenging a card check election would be required to assert that employee signatures were gathered using illegal means, such as coercion. This would be a return to the NLRB's Joy Silk Doctrine, which was in effect from 1949 to 1966.

== Processing the petition ==
If the union has made this threshold showing of support, then the Board will attempt to work out an agreement between the parties for the scheduling of an election. The employer can, however, insist on a hearing to challenge the appropriateness of the unit or to raise other issues.

The NLRB will only hold an election in a unit that it finds to be appropriate. This issue may arise in different forms: as an example, if a union seeks to represent workers at one facility out of several that an employer operates in a particular locale, the Board will have to determine whether the single facility unit is an appropriate one. The same issue might arise within a single site: the union may seek to represent only one group of employees, such as truck drivers, while the employer may claim that the only appropriate unit is a wider one, such as truck drivers, shipping and receiving employees, and warehouse employees.

While the NLRB has developed detailed rules governing what units are appropriate in health care institutions, it takes a more ad hoc approach in other cases, relying on a collection of factors that the Board labels its "community of interest" standard. The Board typically favors broader units over smaller ones, particularly if the union is seeking the broader unit. If a rival union is petitioning for a smaller unit contained within the larger one sought by the petitioning union, as for example in the case in which one union seeks to represent a "wall to wall" unit of all production and maintenance employees in a unit, while another seeks to represent only the skilled trades employees in the maintenance department, the Board may either direct a "Globe" election, in which the craft employees are allowed to vote for inclusion or exclusion as a group in the larger unit, then offered a choice of voting for or against union representation in whatever unit they have voted for.

The Board may also need to determine if a particular individual may be included in the unit. Some individuals, such as independent contractors, supervisors, and agricultural employees, are not "employees" for purposes of the NLRA and may not be included in any unit. Other employees, such as guards, as defined in the Act, may not be included in the same unit as the employees they watch over or represented by the same union that represents those rank and file employees; the Board takes a similar approach toward "confidential employees", who have special access to confidential employer information relating to the employer's labor relations policies. Other employees, such as professional employees, may only be included in the same unit as non-professional employees if they are allowed to vote as a separate group for or against inclusion.

The Board also excludes temporary employees and, unless both employers agree, the employees of subcontractors and temporary agencies who work alongside the employees of the primary employer.

The employer must ordinarily raise these issues before the election is scheduled; it cannot later refuse to bargain on the theory that the unit is inappropriate on grounds it did not make in a timely manner. That rule does not, on the other hand, bar the employer from later challenging an individual employee's ballot on the ground that he or she is not an employee within the meaning of the Act, as for example in the case of a supervisor.

The Board will also allow other unions that claim an interest in representing any or all of the employees in the unit to intervene at this time. If a union already represents any of these employees, then it will be made a party to the case without the need to make any showing of interest; in other cases the Board requires that an outside union produce at least a thirty percent showing of interest in order to argue for a different bargaining unit, a ten percent showing of interest to participate in any hearing, and a single authorization card if all the union seeks is to be included as a choice on the ballot.

The Board will not ordinarily hold an election if the employees in the unit are currently covered by a collective bargaining agreement. The Board will relax its "contract bar" rules, however, in those cases in which the agreement is for more than three years, in which case an election petition by an outside union filed after the third anniversary will be timely. The Board also permits petitions filed during a "window period", a one-month period beginning ninety days before the expiration of the old agreement and ending sixty days before expiration. The Board has developed a complex set of rules governing premature extensions of collective bargaining agreements to enforce its contract bar rule.

The Board is also barred by statute from holding an election in a unit if it has held a valid election in that unit in the last twelve months. This rule does not, however, prevent the Board from requiring a rerun election if it determines that the election was invalid, either because of the conduct of the parties or other reasons. The Board can also conduct an election in a larger unit than the earlier unit and allow employees who voted in the previous election to vote in the second one.

If the parties do not stipulate to an election, then the Regional Director of the NLRB will direct an election to be held. There is no automatic right to appeal from the Regional Director's decision, although an aggrieved party can request the NLRB to review the Regional Director's decision. Such requests for review are rarely granted; even when they are, the Board typically conducts the election as scheduled, impounding the ballots until the Board rules on the request for review.

The Board requires an employer to provide the petitioning union with an "Excelsior list," which should contain the names and addresses of all unit employees, within seven days of the direction of an election.

== "Laboratory conditions" ==
The Board will suspend the processing of an election petition if a "blocking charge" is filed, that is an unfair labor practice charge that, on its face, alleges unlawful conduct that, if true, might interfere with employees' ability to make a free and uncoerced choice of representative, reflecting the fundamental rights defined in NLRA section 7. The Region investigates these charges on an expedited basis, the Regional Director may make a preliminary decision as to whether the charge has merit and, if it does, is likely to affect the election. The Regional Director's decision to block or not block an election is not appealable.

A party filing a charge that might otherwise constitute a blocking charge can formally request the Region to proceed with the petition, notwithstanding the charge, by filing a request to proceed. There is one exception to this rule: the Regional Director always suspends the processing of an election petition to investigate a charge that an employer has unlawfully supported or dominated a labor organization, in violation of NLRA section 8(a)(2) or USC section 158.

These issues may also arise after the election, when the losing party asks that the election be set aside by filing objections to conduct that may have affected the election. Just what sort of conduct may justify overturning an election result depends on the facts of each case and the membership of the NLRB itself at the time it decides the case; while the Board has established some principles that have remained valid for decades, in other areas it has changed its policies radically, often as a result in changes in the ideological makeup of the Board following changes in the party that holds the White House, in the sequence of holdings discussed below.

The employer has the right under the First Amendment to express its support for or opposition to unionization. The permissible expression must not threaten reprisals or promise employee benefits contingent on the outcome of the election. The NLRA states that such "views, arguments, or opinion[s]" do not rise to the level of an unfair labor practice in s.8(c). The line between mere expression of opinion and interference or threat is a difficult one to draw with any precision and has given rise to thousands of NLRB decisions on the subject. For example, a statement by an employer that, to an outsider, may sound like a simple factual prediction (regarding conditions that may occur if the union wins the election), may be taken as a threat when received by an employee whose livelihood depends upon his relationship to that employer.

The NLRB considers a number of factors in deciding whether a particular tactic by an employer or a union destroyed the "Laboratory Conditions" (Note: "The Board has consistently stated that, during an election to determine representation, voting is to occur in a 'laboratory' in which an experiment may be conducted, under conditions as nearly ideal as possible, to determine the uninhibited desires of employees. In re General Shoe Corp., 77 N.L.R.B. 124, 127 (1948)." Cited by NLRB v. River City Elevator No. 01-2887 (2002).) that it has tried to maintain in election campaigns of this sort. The Board will not consider events, no matter how serious, that occurred before the date that the union filed its petition nor, as a matter of common sense, events that occurred after the election. While conduct that violates the employees' s.7 rights, such as the discriminatory discharge of a union activist or threats to close the company if the union wins the election, will often be enough to require the holding of a second election, even the most egregious violations of the Act may not be enough to require a rerun election if they were so isolated that they did not have a perceptible impact on the outcome of the election.

On the other hand, conduct that does not violate the Act, but which may affect the atmosphere in which the election is held, such as campaigning in the polling area on the day of the election or holding "captive audience meetings" that employees are required to attend in the twenty-four hours before the election, had been determined to be sufficient basis to overturn the election. Similarly, misconduct by others, such as the NLRB personnel conducting the election or third parties, including local newspapers or chambers of commerce, have gone both ways: timing of distribution of an editorial that associated unions with racial-equality organizations in a local, small town, southern newspaper, when the union lost the election in pre-Civil Rights Georgia (Note: Sewell Mfg. Co., 138 NLRB 66 (1962). This pre-Civil Rights case stands for the premise that any party inciting racial or ethnic prejudice breaches "Laboratory Conditions.") or when a Japanese businessman's editorial criticizing the American workforce (and the union won the election at a Japanese-owned company) have justified setting aside an election; but it has also been held that one incident is not sufficient for religious or racial hatred to violate the election standard.

Midland National Life Insurance Co. (Note: Midland National Life Insurance Co. v. Local 304A, United Food & Commercial Workers, 263 NLRB 127 (1982)) is a case that reflects the Board's oscillations along White House political lines. This case involved an employer distributing anti-union campaign literature to its employees with their paychecks. The literature included false impressions and other misleading information. The union learned of the document the next morning, 3½ hours before polling. In this 1982 case, the Board decided that the election standards were not lowered to a level that "...impaired the free and informed atmosphere requisite to an untrammeled expression of choice by the employees." (Midland, above.)

In the early 1950s the Board began considering whether employees were "deceived as to the source of the campaign propaganda by trickery or fraud, and that they could therefore neither recognize nor evaluate propaganda for what it was, the Board set aside the election (Midland, above). Later the Board "refined its standard" in Liberal Market (Note: Liberal Market, cited in Midland, above, and United Aircraft Corporation, 103 NLRB at 105.) refusing to consider the truth or falsity of campaign propaganda, but measured the degree to which employees' free choice was impacted by misleading information. For the next seven years, the Board held the "intent to mislead" as an element of the standard" for setting aside an election.

The next refinement of the standard occurred in 1962, when, in Hollywood Ceramics, (Note: Hollywood Ceramics' rule permitted Board evaluation of both the substance and the manner of the campaign representations.) the Board required the "misrepresentation or campaign trickery to involve (1) a substantial departure from the truth, (2)at a time which prevents the other party […] from making an effective reply, so that the misrepresentation, which (3) deliberate or not, may (4) reasonably be expected to have a (5) significant impact on the election." (Numbers added to emphasize elements to be evaluated.)

Fifteen years later, in Shopping Kart Food Market, Inc., (Note: Shopping Kart Food Markets, Inc., 228 NLRB 1311 (1977), cited in Midland, above.) a new administration brought in a board that effectively overruled Hollywood Ceramics, stating that it would "recognize and rely on the employees as mature individuals who are capable of recognizing campaign propaganda for what it is and discounting it" and effectively negating the possibility of policing campaigns. Thus, the Board would set aside an election tainted by misrepresentation only when forgery was involved.

When the Board changed under the next White House administration, the Board returned to its policy of insuring fair election under General Knit. (Note: General Knit of California, Inc., 239 NLRB 619 (1978).)

Another administrative change coincided with the holding in Midland (above) and the Board's requiring forgery to invoke the Board's oversight in a tainted election. However, through all these diametric holdings, the Board has never disowned its responsibility to maintain "Laboratory Conditions"; instead, it wavered on the degree to which those conditions will reflect the real world of heated employee representation elections.

== Conducting the election, counting the ballots and certifying the results ==
The NLRB usually conducts elections at the workplace, setting up a polling area where employees can cast ballots. Each party to the election is allowed a number of observers, depending on the size of the unit. The starting or ending times of the election will depend on the nature of the employer's business; if the employer operates more than two shifts the Board will typically schedule separate polling times to allow employees to vote as they arrive for and leave from work. The Board less often conducts elections by mail ballot, usually in cases in which workers are widely dispersed.

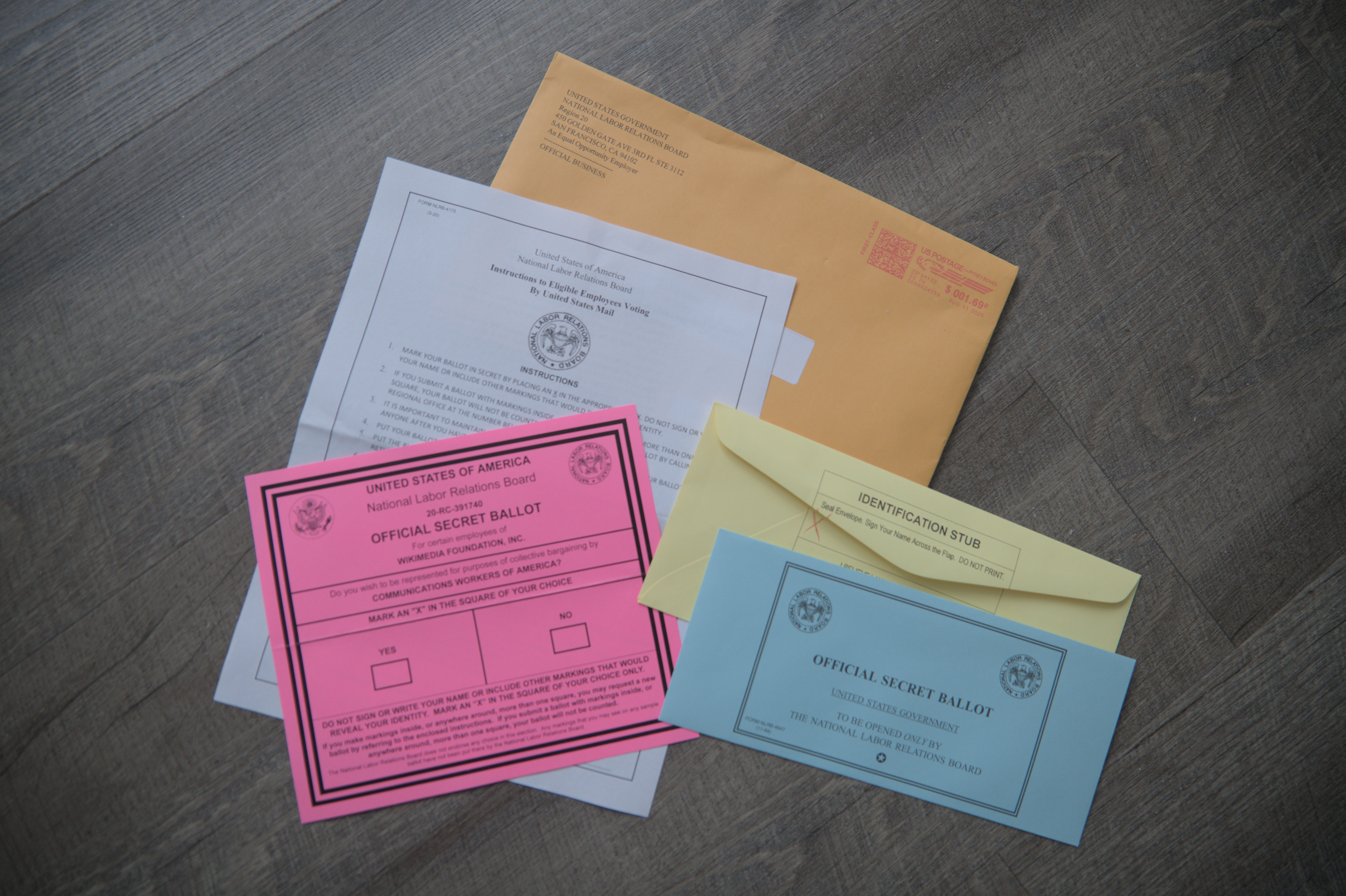
Contents of an NLRB voter kit from the Wikimedia union election

Observers may challenge the ballots of employees when one side or the other claims are not members of the bargaining unit or not eligible to vote for any other reason. The NLRB will challenge the ballot of any voter whose name does not appear on the list supplied by the employer. Those challenged ballots are held separately to be counted after a hearing officer determines, following a post-election hearing, that the individual's vote should be counted. Even then the Board may not make any determination on this issue or counted any challenged ballots if the number of such ballots is too small to affect the outcome of the election.

A party that wishes to protest the outcome of the election must file objections within seven days after the election. The Regional Director determines, after an investigation, whether any of the charges have enough merit to justify a hearing into them. The hearing officer conducting that hearing will also resolve any challenges to individual employees' ballots if they are sufficient to affect the outcome of the election. If a party has also filed unfair labor practice charges based on the conduct it claims made a fair election impossible, the hearing on its objections will be held by the administrative law judge before any such unfair labor practice charges are tried.

== Legal challenges to the results ==
While the Board will hear a party's appeal from a decision rejecting its objections to an election, there is no right to judicial review of the NLRB's decision. The ostensible purpose of this denial of direct judicial review is to expedite the determination of questions concerning union representation.

In practice, however, the lack of judicial review often produces the opposite result. An employer that wants to challenge the Board's certification of a union in court must engage in what is referred to as a "technical refusal to bargain" in order to draw an unfair labor practice charge against it under Section 8(a)(5) of the Act. The General Counsel of the NLRB will typically file an unfair labor practice complaint against it for refusing to bargain, at which point the employer can then raise the same objections to the election that it raised earlier as a defense to the unfair labor practice charges against it. While the Board will almost always reject these objections on the ground that they have already been ruled upon, this enables the employer to raise these objections in the appellate court proceedings concerning the Board's decision in the unfair labor practice case.

The employer runs certain risks in engaging in a technical refusal to bargain; among other things, it may be liable to employees if it makes changes in their terms and conditions of employment without bargaining with the union. However, because the General Counsel of the NLRB rarely seeks injunctive relief in cases of this sort, an employer that wants to take the risk of liability and believes it can withstand a strike can delay bargaining with a union for years after it has won the election.

Unions can also seek judicial review of unfavorable election results by picketing for recognition in the hope of drawing a charge under Section 8(b)(7) of the Act.

There is a narrow exception to this general rule under which a party to a representation case can seek injunctive relief directly in the federal courts to prevent the NLRB from holding an election in defiance of an express statutory limitation, e.g., failing to hold a separate self-determination election for professional employees. These cases are exceptionally infrequent.

== Bargaining orders ==
The NLRB also has the power to order an employer to bargain with the union, even though the union has not won an election, as a remedy for egregious unfair labor practices by the employer. Such orders, commonly known as "Gissel orders" after the United States Supreme Court case NLRB v. Gissel Packing Co. that authorized them, may only be issued if the union can show that it once had majority support and that the employer's unlawful conduct destroyed that support. The Board has identified a number of "hallmark" violations, such as threats to close the operation made by an authoritative member of management and disseminated widely through the workforce, that will support a Gissel order.

The appellate courts have been less receptive to these orders and have frequently refused to enforce them on a number of grounds, e.g., that employee turnover in the years while the charge was being litigated makes a bargaining order inappropriate.

== Successorship ==
An employer may also be ordered to bargain with a union, even though the union has not been certified as the representative of any of its employees, if it is the successor to an employer that was obliged to bargain with the union. Successorship requires (1) that the new employer draw a majority of its workforce from the bargaining unit the union previously represented, (2) that the new employer be engaged in the same general line of business as its predecessor, and (3) that the bargaining unit has not been changed so drastically in the transfer of the business from the old to the new employer that it is no longer an appropriate one.

It is not necessary to show that the new employer bought the predecessor's business in order to prove successorship; an employer that does nothing more than buy the assets of another company, or a competitor that supplants another employer by underbidding it, can still be a successor if it draws most of its workforce from the old bargaining unit and remains in the same general line of business. In addition, an employer may be a successor, even if it does not hire any of its predecessor's employees, if it refused to hire them because of their union membership or activities.

== Decertification elections ==
Employees represented by a union can also petition to decertify the union. They must also produce evidence that at least thirty percent of the unit supports decertification and are bound by the same "contract bar" rules as a unit, whether it is one created by the NLRB or one created or modified by the parties through collective bargaining. Decertification elections are also subject to the same rules concerning improper campaign conduct as elections initiated by a union.

Decertification can also occur if the employer received substantial evidence that the union no longer has the support of a majority of the bargaining unit. Typically, this is accomplished through giving a petition, signed by a majority of the bargaining unit, to a member of Management.

== Voluntary recognition and accretion ==
It is lawful for an employer to recognize a union, without going through an NLRB-conducted election, so long as the union has proof of support from more than half of the employees in the bargaining unit. That proof may not be valid, however, if the employer has given unlawful assistance to the union in collecting authorization cards or if another union has filed a petition seeking to represent these employees before the employer grants recognition.

In addition, new employees may be added to an existing unit without the need for either an election or proof of majority support if they share such an overwhelming community of interest with the employees in the existing unit that they could not be represented separately. As an example, a new department in a factory in which a union represents all of the production and maintenance employees in a "wall to wall" unit is likely to be accreted to that unit. The NLRB will not accrete employees to an existing unit, however, if they have been historically excluded from the unit, no matter how strong the community of interest might be; in that case the union must obtain proof of majority support to add them to the unit.

== Modifying the unit or amending the certification ==
The Board will also entertain petitions to resolve disputes whether individuals in a new classification should be added to or remain within the unit. The Board will not, on the other hand, modify the clear language of a collective bargaining agreement or the parties' established practice that either includes or excludes such employees.

The Board can also amend a certification. This is usually done for technical reasons: to reflect the change in name of either the union or the employer, or a union's affiliation with another union, or a change in location of the work covered by the certification.
