= Lidl Ltd v CAC =

Lidl Ltd v Central Arbitration Committee
- Court: Court of Appeal
- Citation: [2017] EWCA Civ 328

Lidl Ltd v Central Arbitration Committee [2017] EWCA Civ 328 is a UK labour law case, concerning the definition of a bargaining unit for a union to be recognised under statute.

== Facts ==
Lidl Ltd claimed the CAC wrongly decided warehouse workers were an appropriate bargaining unit under TULRCA 1992 Schedule A1, paragraph 19B(3)(c). Lidl Ltd supplied staff to its own supermarkets and recognised no union. The union wanted recognition for 1.2 per cent of the employer's total workforce. The CAC found this bargaining unit was appropriate.

== Judgment ==
=== High Court ===
The High Court refused the claim for judicial review. Schedule A1 para 19B(3)(c) was not misconstrued by the CAC under the requirement to have regard to ‘the desirability of avoiding small fragmented bargaining units within an undertaking’. The CAC said that because there was only one bargaining unit, there were no ‘small fragmented bargaining units’ to avoid.

=== Court of Appeal ===
Underhill LJ held that the CAC had made no mistake. The words ‘units’ and ‘fragmented’ naturally connoted a whole that had been broken into parts. The context was to ensure that employers should not have to negotiate in more than one forum with more than one trade union in respect of workers that were much the same. The policy expressed by para.19B(3)(c) was that, other things being equal, where a group of employees could appropriately be bargained for by a single trade union in a single bargaining unit, it was desirable that they should be. Future legal challenges based on the parsing of the constituent parts of para.19B were to be strongly discouraged.

Longmore LJ agreed.

== See also ==
- UK labour law
