= Sun Trapp =

Gay bar and nightclub in Salt Lake City, Utah, U.S.

The SunTrapp
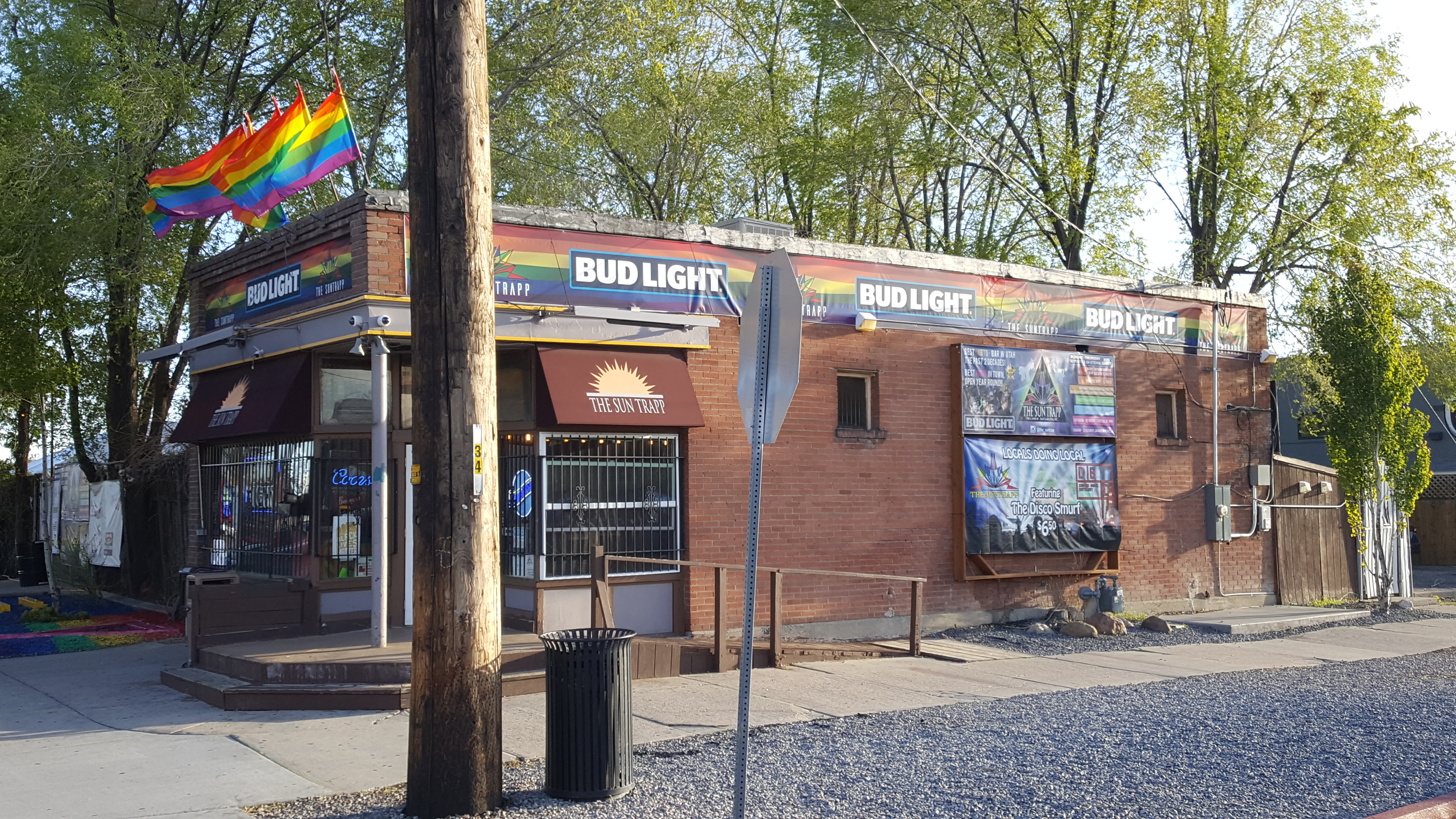
- The bar's exterior in 2021
- Interactive map of The SunTrapp
- Address: Salt Lake City, Utah; United States
- Coordinates: 40°46′1.1″N 111°54′30.8″W
- Type: Gay bar; nightclub

The SunTrapp is a gay bar and nightclub in Salt Lake City, Utah. It is considered to be the oldest gay bar in Utah. As of 2 December 2025, The SunTrapp is the first unionized bar in the state of Utah.

== History ==
The SunTrapp was founded in 1973.

In 2020, the SunTrapp closed for 42 days and had to restructure staff shifts during the COVID-19 pandemic. Half of staff were laid off. The business joined a lawsuit to challenge alcohol sales rules during the pandemic.

In September 2025, SunTrapp Workers United, a proposed union of SunTrapp employees with the Communications Workers of America Local 7765, petitioned the owner of the bar, Mary Peterson, to voluntarily recognize the union. Shortly thereafter, Peterson fired, then rehired, several of the workers involved in the unionization drive. Unionizing workers went on an Unfair Labor Practice strike on 3 October 2025.

On 31 October 2025, the SunTrapp announced that it was closing for business, citing financial strain from the ongoing strike as the reason.

On 2 December 2025, The SunTrapp reopened after owner Mary Peterson voluntarily recognized the SunTrapp Workers Unite union, and striking bar staff workers returned to work. This marks the very first unionized bar in the state of Utah.

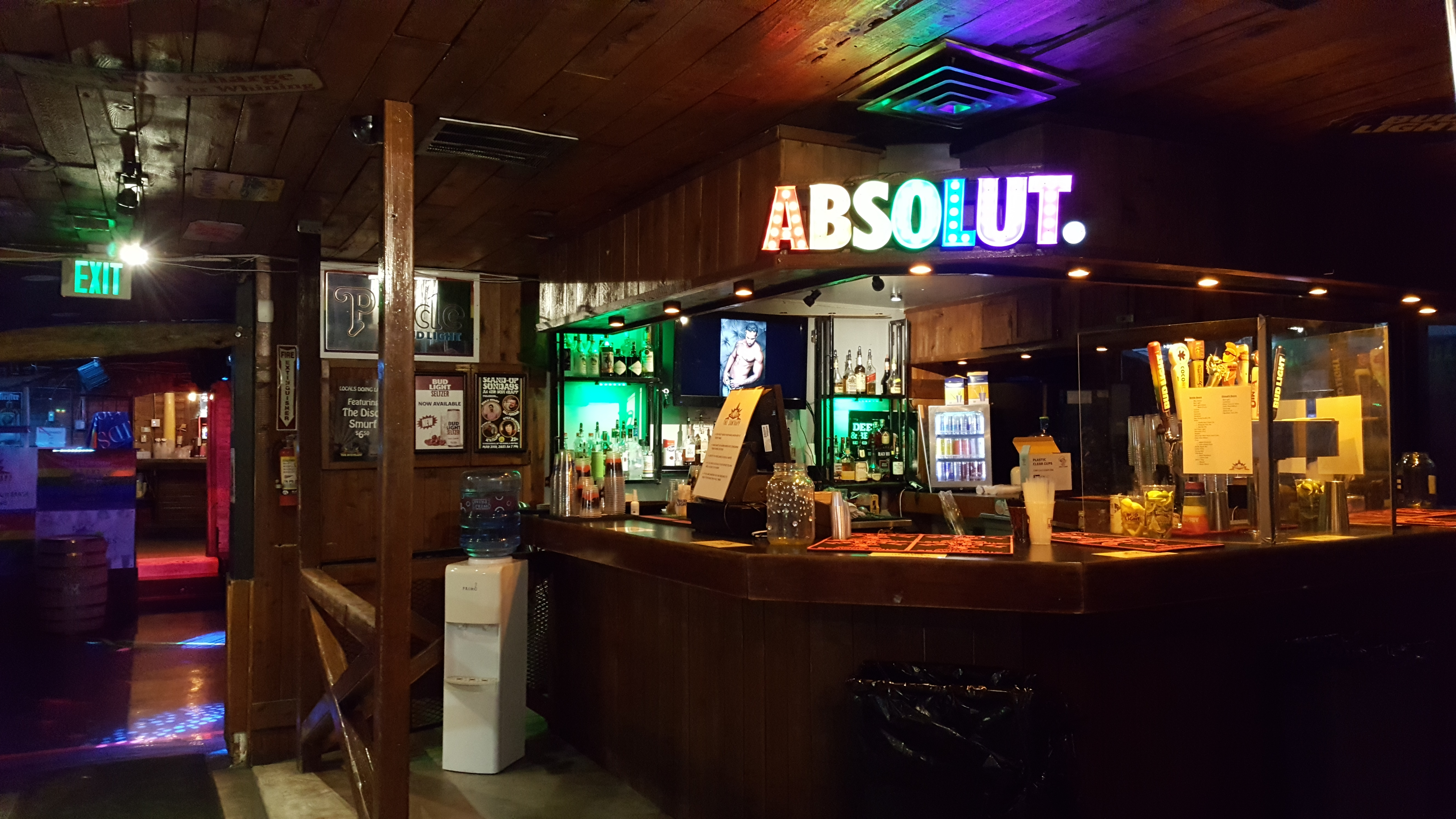
Interior bar

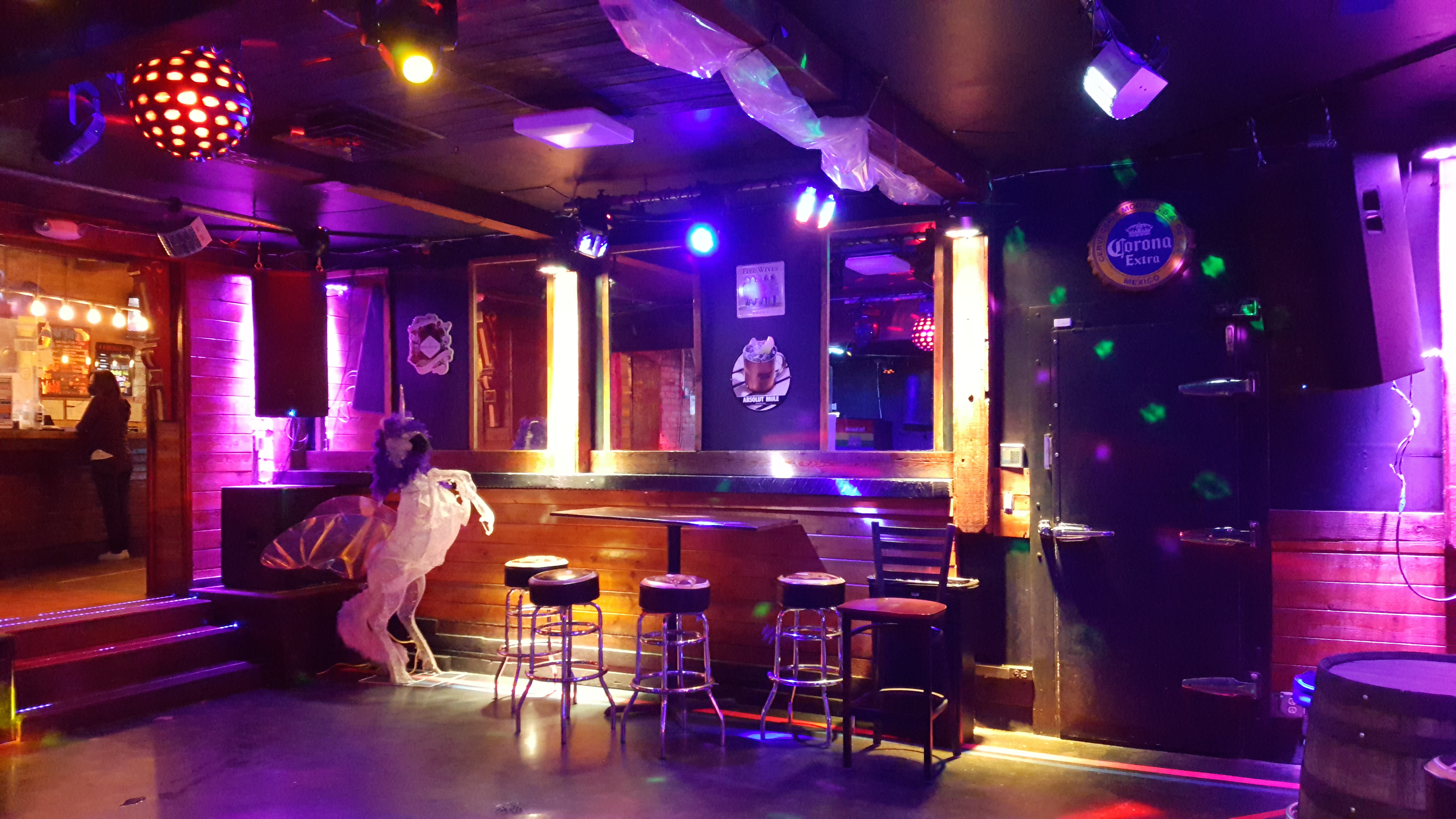
Dance floor

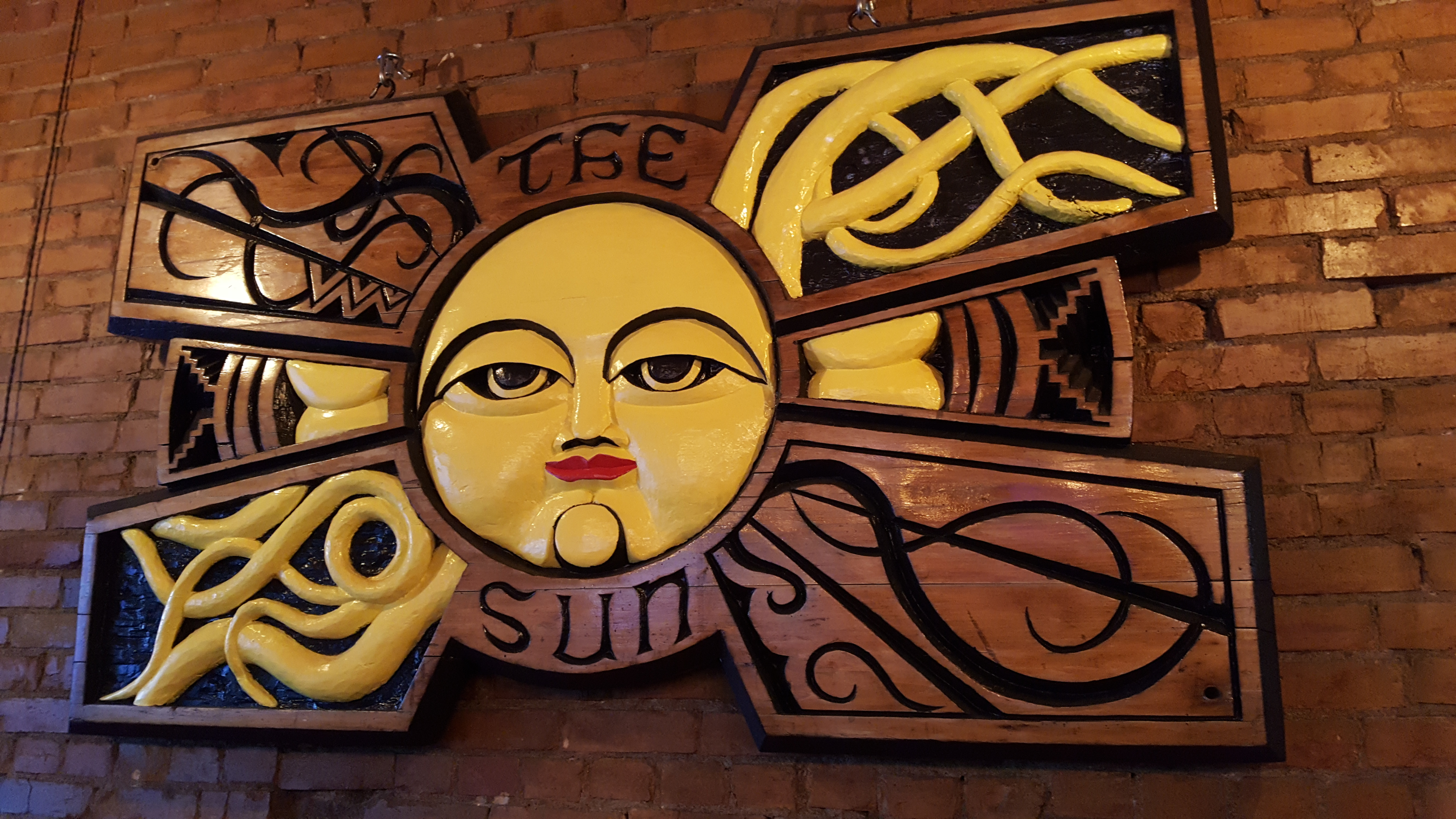
Sign
