= Phyllis Cheng =

American lawyer

Phyllis W. Cheng is an American lawyer providing mediation, investigation and expert witness services in Los Angeles, California. She retired as a partner from DLA Piper LLP (US), a global law firm, where she practiced employment law representing businesses. Before that, Cheng served for nearly seven years as director of the California Department of Fair Employment and Housing (DFEH), the largest state civil rights agency in the country. Cheng abruptly resigned days before release of a report that was expected to be critical of her department.

== Early life ==
Phyllis W. Cheng, born on the Fourth of July, emigrated from Hong Kong as a girl and speaks three dialects of Chinese.

== Education ==
Cheng received her B.A. in art and M.Ed. from UCLA, her Ph.D. from the University of Southern California (USC), focusing on civil rights policy and planning, and her J.D. degree from Southwestern Law School, where she is on the Board of Trustees.

== Career ==
Before becoming a lawyer, Cheng worked in the field of education. She was the Title IX coordinator at the Los Angeles Unified School District, spearheaded a citizens' commission to remedy district-wide sex discrimination, and monitored a Title VII consent decree promoting women in school administration. Building on this work, Cheng was responsible for California's version of Title IX, prohibiting sex discrimination in education. Continuing her advocacy on behalf of women and education, former California Governor George Deukmejian appointed Cheng to the California Commission on the Status of Women and the Interagency Coordinating Task Force on Early Intervention.

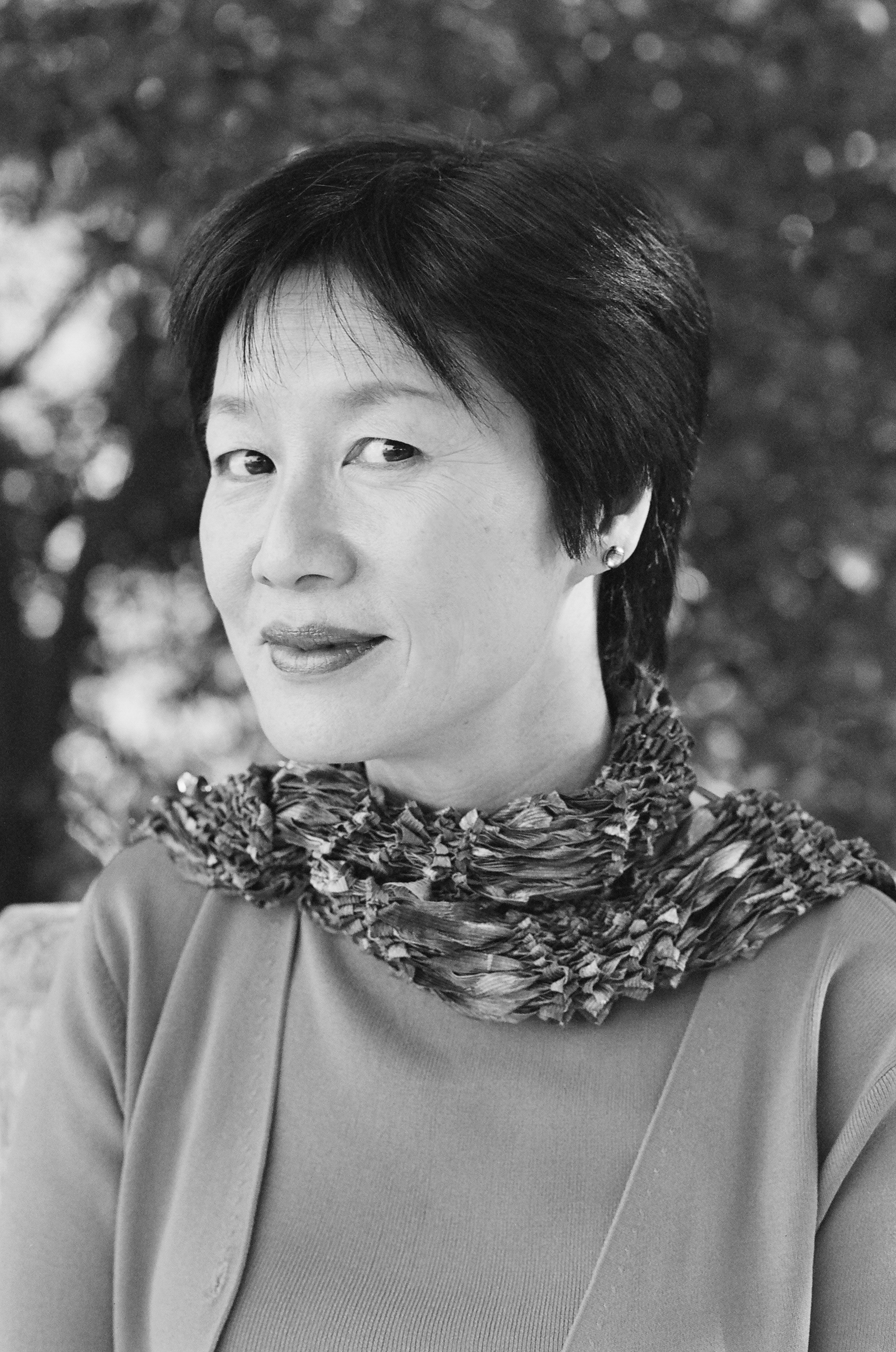
Phyllis Cheng, director of Department of Fair Employment and Housing (State of California)

Cheng was also a researcher on school desegregation at the RAND Corporation, adjunct faculty at the UCLA Graduate School of Education and Information Studies, director of a mentoring program for at-risk girls at USC, and a debate panelist on KNBC's Emmy-winning "Free 4 All" program.

Cheng began her legal career with an appointment by former California Governor Pete Wilson to two terms on the California Fair Employment and Housing Commission, where she ruled on nearly 80 fair employment and housing and civil rights act cases. She subsequently gained experience in all facets of employment and discrimination law: as an associate at plaintiff-side Hadsell & Stormer, a deputy attorney general in the Civil Rights Enforcement Section of the California Department of Justice, a senior appellate court attorney to the Honorable Laurie D. Zelon of the California Court of Appeal in Los Angeles, and an of counsel at management-side Littler Mendelson.

=== DFEH Director ===
Former California Governor Arnold Schwarzenegger appointed Cheng to be the Director of the DFEH in January 2008. Governor Jerry Brown retained her when he came into office. She was unanimously confirmed by the California State Senate. Under her direction, Cheng modernized the Department into a proactive and innovative agency. She harnessed new technology to automate appointment and right-to-sue systems, establish user-friendly telephone intake, launch a cost-effective cloud-based case management system, and develop a case grading system to better target resources. The case management program caused investigators to duplicate some of their work, had frequent system crashes, and created a 1,200-case backlog. The Senate Rules Committee documented Cheng's shortsighted attempts to quicken investigations by nixing face-to-face interviews. Prior to the release of this report, Cheng abruptly resigned.

Cheng also established systemic investigations and litigation to address discrimination at the DFEH; achieved a $8,730,000 nationwide settlement regarding access for test takers with disabilities against the Law School Admission Council; reached a $6,011,190 class complaint settlement regarding family leave against Verizon; launched a new attorney-staffed dispute resolution division to encourage out-of-court settlements; sponsored legislation and promulgated the Department's procedural regulations; conducted outreach in person and via mass and social media to hundreds of communities statewide; developed partnerships with seven institutions of higher learning to train future civil rights lawyers and investigators; and introduced new resources to educate the public on civil rights compliance. Cheng also helped Governor Jerry Brown reform California's civil rights enforcement in 2012. In the process, the Department reduced 50 percent of its overhead, resulting in substantial savings to the State, while promoting training, retaining jobs, and providing upward mobility for its staff. Due to all of these efforts and her career in public service, Cheng received the Ronald M. George Public Lawyer of the Year Award for 2012 from the State Bar of California. The State Bar's Council on Access and Fairness further named the DFEH Educational Partnerships winner of the 2013 Education Pipeline Award Cheng abruptly resigned days before release of a report that was expected to be critical of her department.
