= Alliance Against Sexual Coercion =

Group to prevent sexual coercion

The Alliance Against Sexual Coercion (AASC) was an American organization that aimed to address sexual coercion and sexual harassment faced by working women. The organization was established in June 1976 by Freada Kapor Klein, Lynn Wehrli, and Elizabeth Cohn-Stuntz. They argued that sexual harassment toward women increases difficulties for women in the workplace by reinforcing the idea that women are inferior to men.

== History/Objectives ==
The Alliance Against Sexual Coercion was founded in Cambridge, Massachusetts in 1976. The founders, Freada Kapor Klein, Lynn Wehrli, and Elizabeth Cohn-Stuntz had all worked at th Washington DC rape crisis center, and were experienced in addressing sexual harassment claims. The organisation was founded with a focus on intersectionality. Sexual harassment had been a documented issue since the 1900s, and was a part of working women's lives. The issue often went unaddressed by unions, and women experiencing harassment were often subject to Victim blaming.

Mary Anderson, the first director of the United States Women's Bureau the Department of Labor, described in her autobiography how women carried knives to protect themselves from foremen, and a strike leading to the firing of the foremen and an increase in women's wages.

== AASC hotline ==
In 1978, Susan Meyer and Karen Sauvigné, friends of activist Lin Farley, created a National Information and Referral Service with the help of a $6,500 grant from the city of New York. Meyer and Sauvigné had also worked at the Washington DC Rape Crisis Center, and had campaigned against sexual harassment in the District of Columbia. The hotline provided emotional support and advice to victims of sexual harassment, and referred callers to attorneys and counselors. It was decided that the hotline was not sufficient to address the issue. The organization contemplated addressing the issue through the legal system.

Freada Klein and Lynn Wehrli released a publication stating that legal reform was required in order to address widespread sexual coercion. At the time, there was no legal definition of sexual harassment. Klein and Wehli argued that this showed men that there would be no consequences for sexual harassment.

=== Legal options ===
The AASC made several proposals addressing workplace sexual harassment. These included laws to protect victims and hold perpetrators accountable. The group advocated for an intersectional approach, stating that black and brown men were more likely to be accused and convicted than their white counterparts. The AASC intersectional approach focused on changing male opinions on inequality in the workplace instead of making women change their behavior.

==== Corne v. Bausch & Lomb, Inc. case ====
On March 14, 1975, Jane Corne, Geneva Devane, and other plaintiffs filed a case in U.S. District Court for the District of Arizona against the Bausch & Lomb Company. The complaint alleged the violation of civil rights based on sex discrimination. The case was dismissed. The judge ruled that the accusers failed to exhaust their potential remedies through other state channels before filing the lawsuit, failed to file the case in a timely manner, and that the suit failed "to state a claim for relief for violation of Title VII of the 1964 Civil Rights Act" while the actions of the supervisor were regarded as a matter of "a personal proclivity, peculiarity or mannerism. By his alleged sexual advances, Mr. Price was satisfying a personal urge" with no company policy involved.

==== Williams v. Saxbe case ====
Williams v. Saxbe was the first case to validate the harassment of women under gender discrimination. In this case, Diane Williams, a lawyer in the Department of Justice, was terminated in 1972 after being sexually harassed by her supervision. She sued the Department of Justice, claiming that she had been denied equal opportunity because of her sex under Title VII of the Civil Rights Act of 1964, as amended by Equal Employment Opportunity Act of 1972. Judge Charles R. Richey's ruling held that the Civil Rights Act shields employees from retaliation for refusing their superior's sexual propositions, a historic change to the legal perspectives on workplace sexual harassment.

== Publications ==
Members of the AASC published materials in order to increase awareness around sexual harassment, as well as its history, social context, and legal implications.

=== First position paper ===
In October 1976, Klein and Wehrli published the 'first position paper'. This paper linked sexual coercion to economic power, as well as highlighted the parallels between sexual harassment and rape, the positioning of the issue in feminist activism, and the lack of legal protection for victims.

=== 1977 brochure ===
The twenty-three page 1977 brochure was created by AASC members Rags Brophy, Mary Bularzik, Martha Hooven, Freada Klein, Elizabeth Cohn-Stuntz, and Lynn Wehrli, using a grant from Wellesley College's Center for Research on Women in Higher Education and the Professions. The brochure was released in a package along with advertisements for the AASC, templates for addressing harassers, and a copy of the first position paper.

The brochure argued that sexual harassment was a form of violence against women. It included advice for victims of harassment, a history of harassment, and its effects on economically vulnerable women. The piece also criticized capitalism, blaming it for creating a sexist and racist society.

== Intersectionality ==
=== Capitalism ===
The AASC was highly critical of capitalism. In the 1978 article "The Role of Capitalism: Understanding Sexual Harassment", members Martha Hooven and Nancy McDonald argued that the capitalist system relied on hierarchies in order to function, including those created by sexism and racism. They also blamed capitalism for giving female workers low wages, forcing them to stay in jobs where they faced harassment.
