= Boyce McDaniel =

American nuclear physicist (1917–2002)

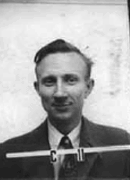
- Boyce McDaniel at Los Alamos
- Born: June 11, 1917; Brevard, North Carolina
- Died: May 8, 2002 (aged 84); Ithaca, New York
- Education: Ohio Wesleyan University (B.S.), Case School of Applied Science (M.S.), Cornell University (Ph.D.)
- Known for: Performed the final check on the first atomic bomb.
- Scientific career
- Fields: Nuclear physics, Accelerator physics
- Workplaces: MIT, Manhattan Project, Laboratory for Nuclear Studies, Cornell, Fermilab
- Doctoral advisors: Robert Bacher; Hans Bethe

Boyce Dawkins McDaniel (June 11, 1917 – May 8, 2002) was an American nuclear physicist who worked on the Manhattan Project and later directed the Cornell University Laboratory of Nuclear Studies (LNS). McDaniel was skilled in constructing "atom smashing" devices to study the fundamental structure of matter and helped to build the most powerful particle accelerators of his time. Together with his graduate student, he invented the pair spectrometer.

During World War II, McDaniel used his electronics expertise to help develop cyclotrons used to separate Uranium isotopes. McDaniel is also noted as having performed the final check on the first atomic bomb prior to its detonation in the Trinity test, during a lightning storm.

== Biography ==
Born in Brevard, North Carolina, McDaniel attended Chesterville High School in Ohio. After graduating in 1933, he attended Ohio Wesleyan University, from which he graduated in 1938 with a Bachelor of Science. His initial postgraduate studies took place at the Case School of Applied Science, graduating with a master's degree in 1940. McDaniel continued postgraduate studies when he moved to Cornell University, and in 1943 he completed his doctoral thesis, examining the absorption rates of neutrons in indium. The research was not classified, but McDaniel and Robert Bacher, his adviser at Cornell, marked it as "secret" on their own initiative. From Cornell, McDaniel moved to MIT where he held a postdoctoral position, studying "the rapidly evolving field of fast electronics", which he applied to research in particle physics.

After the outbreak of World War II, McDaniel joined Bacher in Los Alamos, New Mexico to work for the Manhattan Project, where he became a part of Robert R. Wilson's cyclotron research team. McDaniel was to have "a crucial role in helping to identify the amount of uranium-235 needed to ... detonate the world's first nuclear bomb". McDaniel is also noted as having performed the final check on the first atomic bomb prior to its detonation in the Trinity test.

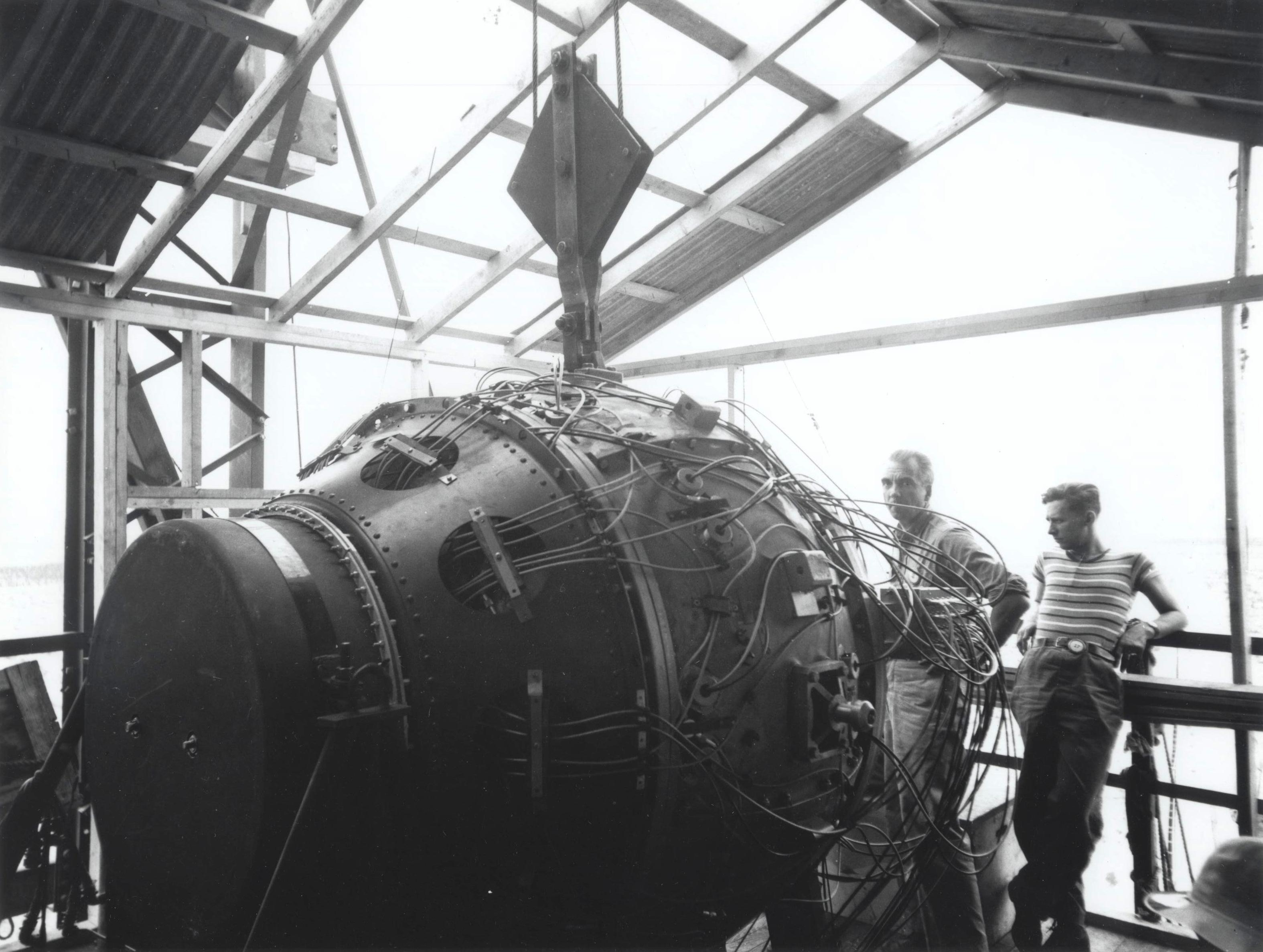
McDaniel (right) and Norris Bradbury with the "gadget" atom bomb ahead of the Trinity test.

McDaniel was one of many Manhattan Project researchers to join the Cornell faculty after the war. He became an assistant professor in 1946 and became a full professor in 1955. With his Ph.D. student Robert Walker, he invented the pair spectrometer, a device that measures gamma ray energies. He was a co-founder of Cornell's Laboratory for Nuclear Studies (LNS) and had helped create the 300 megavolt (MeV) electron synchrotron, one of the first such accelerators in the world. He and Wilson, who was McDaniel's predecessor as director of LNS, built three more electron synchrotrons of 1 GeV, 2 GeV, and 10 GeV, each of which enabled physicists to study phenomena in a new energy range. McDaniel quickly earned a reputation as a hands-on designer as indicated by this episode in the construction of the 300 MeV synchrotron:

The magnet coil was wound incorrectly, a fatal flaw. To get it repaired by the manufacturer could take months. Mac made a toy model of the coil, studied it carefully for an evening, and discovered an ingenious but simple way to repair it, which he did in about a day, and defused the crisis.

He was a Fulbright research fellow in 1953 at the Australian National University and a Guggenheim fellow in 1959 at the University of Rome.

In 1967, McDaniel became director of LNS and served until he retired from the Cornell faculty in 1985. He research included important measurements with each of the series of LNS accelerators, including studies lambda-baryon photo production, K-meson production, and measurements of the neutron electromagnetic form factors.

Accelerators That McDaniel Helped Develop
| Power | Year |
|---|---|
| 300 MeV Cornell | 1947 |
| 1 GeV Cornell | 1957 |
| 2 GeV Cornell | 1964 |
| 10 GeV Cornell | 1967 |
| 12 GeV (effective) CESR | 1979 |
| 300 GeV FermiLab | 1973 |

Wilson and McDaniel continued to collaborate at Cornell until Wilson left to head Fermilab in Batavia, Illinois in 1967. In 1972, Wilson invited McDaniel to serve as acting head of the accelerator section at Fermilab, and McDaniel took a one-year leave of absence from Cornell. Though the Fermilab accelerator had been placed into operation, it suffered from frequent component failures. When McDaniel left eight months later, he led the effort which increased the power of Fermilab's accelerator from 20 GeV to 300 GeV and its beam density by a factor of 1000. Of McDaniel's contribution to Fermilab, Wilson said, "This bravura performance demonstrated Mac’s skill for leadership as well as his celebrated sixth sense for finding sources of trouble and fixing them.” Upon returning to Cornell in 1974, McDaniel proposed upgrading the then existing 10 GeV synchrotron with an 8 GeV electron-positron storage ring, which would greatly increase the energy of particle collisions when the particles in the storage ring hit the particles traveling in the opposite direction in the synchrotron. When constructed in 1979, the Cornell Electron Storage Ring became the world's primary source of information about one of the fundamental building blocks of matter, the b-quark. After the end of particle physics experiments 20 years later, CESR is now used as a test facility of damping rings for a future international linear collider. In 1981, McDaniel developed a proposal for a new mile-diameter electron-positron collider called CESR II, but could not obtain the necessary $200 million in funding for it. In 1988, McDaniel was Visiting Distinguished Professor at Arizona State University.

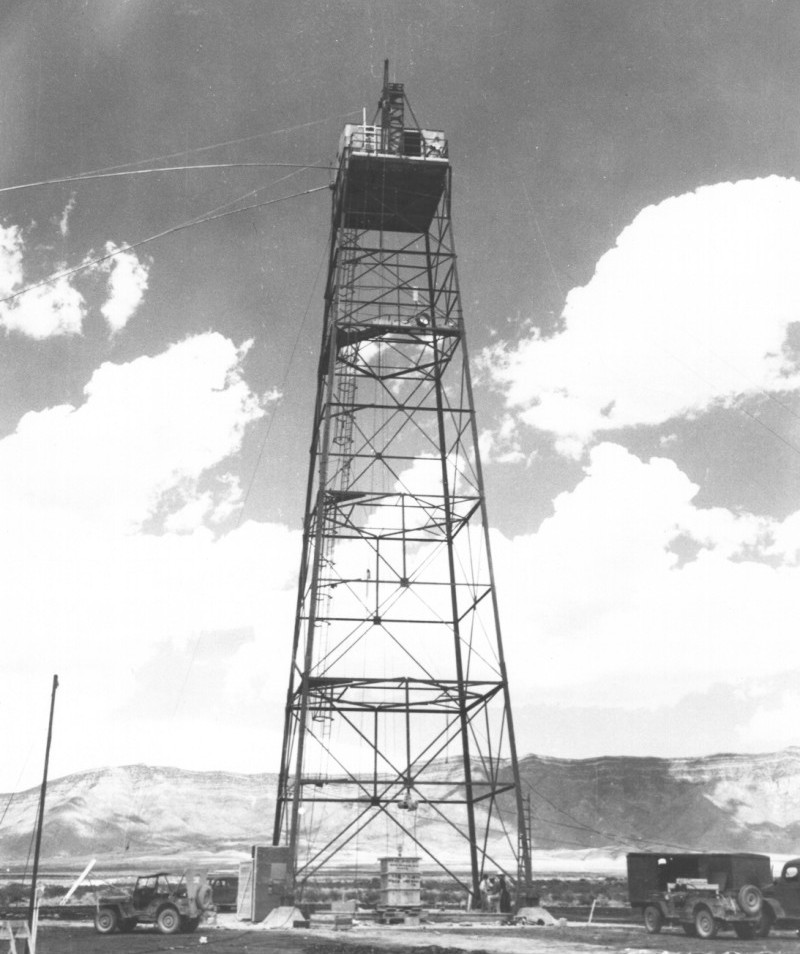
Tower used to hold the Trinity test device for detonation.

When interviewed in 1973 about his feelings on his work resulting in the dropping of atomic bombs on Japanese cities, McDaniel said:

It's so difficult to assess these things today. I would have preferred to see a demonstration and am rather sad that it didn't work out that way ... but I don't know if it would have worked out as a useful venture. I have no idea what the Japanese would have done.

=== Sexual harassment allegation ===
In 1975, 11 years before the Supreme Court decision in Meritor Savings Bank v. Vinson recognized sexual harassment as a violation of the Civil Rights Act of 1964, Carmita Dickerson Wood, an administrative assistant to McDaniel, quit her job after years of alleged sexual harassment by McDaniel, bringing her case to Lin Farley and the Working Women United organization which Farley chaired. Wood was denied unemployment benefits by Cornell after having cited "personal reasons" as the cause of her departure. She was later placed in another job on Cornell's campus. No formal investigation into the allegations was conducted, and McDaniel was not formally investigated by Cornell nor reprimanded. Nevertheless, the incident contributed to a surge in interest in workplace sexual harassment which culminated in the 1986 decision.

== Honors ==
McDaniel was elected to the National Academy of Sciences in 1981. He was a governing board member of Fermilab, a trustee of the Associated Universities, a member of the Department of Energy High Energy Advisory Panel, a trustee of the Universities Research Association and a board member of Brookhaven National Laboratory.

In 1993, the McDaniels donated a farm to the Cornell Plantations, which named the 60.6 acre property the Jane McDaniel Preserve.

In 2002, McDaniel died of a heart attack in Ithaca, New York, aged 84.

== See also ==
- List of accelerators in particle physics
