= Card check =

Method for employees to organize into a labor union

Card check, also called majority sign-up, is a method for employees to organize into a labor union, in which a majority of employees in a bargaining unit sign authorization forms, or "cards", stating they wish to be represented by the union. Based on this evidence that the majority of eligible employees want a union, the employees can request their employer to voluntarily recognize the union. In the United States, the National Labor Relations Act (NLRA) enables voluntary recognition based on majority support an alternative to the National Labor Relations Board's (NLRB) election procedures.

As of 2025, card check allows for unionization without an election in five of Canada's ten provinces when a majority of employees indicate support via authorization cards. In Canada, card check was recognized nationwide prior to the 1980s, when six provinces mandated union elections, after which the country's union density declined by 7% from 1984 to 1998.

== United States ==
=== Current law ===
Section 9(a) of NLRA (29 U.S.C. § 159) states that a union may be "designated or selected for the purposes of collective bargaining by the majority of the employees". There are three ways for workers to form a union in a particular workplace in the United States:

- A petition or an authorization card with the signatures of at least 30% of the employees requesting a union is submitted to the National Labor Relations Board (NLRB), then the NLRB orders and oversees a secret ballot election using NLRB election procedures.
- As an alternative, if a majority (over 50%) of the employees sign authorization cards requesting a union, the employees can present the evidence to the employer that a majority of employees want a union, and the employer can voluntarily choose to waive the secret ballot election process and recognize the union. The employees may work with a neutral third party to validate signed cards; validating signed cards with an arbitrator can protect the privacy of employees who signed cards or not. Based on the 2023 Cemex decision, if the employer does not choose to voluntarily recognize a union after presentation of majority support, the employer needs to file a petition with the NLRB to initiate a secret ballot election. As of 2026, the Cemex decision is undergoing appeals and challenges in court.
- As a last resort, the NLRB can order an employer to recognize a union if a majority of employees have signed cards and the employer has engaged in unfair labor practices that make a fair election unlikely.

=== Proposed law ===
Under the proposed Employee Free Choice Act (EFCA), if the NLRB verifies that over 50% of the employees signed authorization cards, the secret ballot election is bypassed and a union is automatically formed. Introduced in the U.S. Congress in 2005 and reintroduced in 2007 and 2009, the EFCA provides that the NLRB would recognize the union's role as the official bargaining representative if a majority of employees have authorized that representation via card check, without requiring a secret ballot election. Under the EFCA, if over 30% and fewer than 50% of employees sign a petition or authorization cards, the NLRB would still order a secret ballot election for union representation.

=== History ===
Since the National Labor Relations Act of 1935 was passed, it has been legal for workers to form a union when a majority of employees in a bargaining unit sign cards indicating their intent to bargain collectively with the employer. The National Labor Relations Board in its early days "certified on the record when there had been an agreement with the employer for card-check" ... "in the final year before the Taft-Hartley Act was passed [in 1947], 646 representation petitions were informally resolved through the card-check procedure".

In 1949, the NLRB's Joy Silk doctrine established that "an employer could lawfully refuse to bargain with a union claiming representative status through possession of authorization cards only if he had a 'good faith doubt' as to the union's majority status."

In 1969, Chief Justice Earl Warren delivered the majority opinion for the U.S. Supreme Court that upheld the use of card check. Warren stated, "Almost from the inception of the Act, then, it was recognized that a union did not have to be certified as the winner of a Board election to invoke a bargaining obligation; it could establish majority status by other means... by showing convincing support, for instance, by a union-called strike or strike vote, or, as here, by possession of cards signed by a majority of the employees authorizing the union to represent them for collective bargaining purposes." NLRB v. Gissel Packing Co., (1969). The Supreme Court has consistently ruled in favor of card check, and Warren cited prior affirmations in NLRB v. Bradford Dyeing Assn., (1940); Franks Bros. Co. v. NLRB, (1944); United Mine Workers v. Arkansas Flooring Co., (1956).

=== Support ===
Supporters of card check argue that it makes it easier for workers to join unions. For example, in his remarks accompanying the introduction of the Employee Free Choice Act, Rep. George Miller (D-Calif.), former chairman of the U.S. House Committee on Education and Labor, described the limitations of the system of NLRB elections:

The current process for forming unions is badly broken and so skewed in favor of those who oppose unions, that workers must literally risk their jobs in order to form a union. Although it is illegal, one-quarter of employers facing an organizing drive have been found to fire at least one worker who supports a union. In fact, employees who are active union supporters have a one-in-five chance of being fired for legal union activities. Sadly, many employers resort to spying, threats, intimidation, harassment and other illegal activity in their campaigns to oppose unions. The penalty for illegal activity, including firing workers for engaging in protected activity, is so weak that it does little to deter law breakers.

Even when employers don't break the law, the process itself stacks the deck against union supporters. The employer has all the power; they control the information workers can receive, can force workers to attend anti-union meetings during work hours, can require workers to meet with supervisors who deliver anti-union messages, and can even imply that the business will close if the union wins. Union supporters' access to employees, on the other hand, is heavily restricted.

The Employee Free Choice Act [with its provisions for majority sign-up] would add some fairness to the system…

Barack Obama supported the bill. An original co-sponsor of the Employee Free Choice Act, then-Sen. Obama urged his colleagues to pass the bill during a 2007 motion to proceed:

I support this bill because in order to restore a sense of shared prosperity and security, we need to help working Americans exercise their right to organize under a fair and free process and bargain for their fair share of the wealth our country creates. The current process for organizing a workplace denies too many workers the ability to do so. The Employee Free Choice Act offers to make binding an alternative process under which a majority of employees can sign up to join a union. Currently, employers can choose to accept—but are not bound by law to accept—the signed decision of a majority of workers. That choice should be left up to workers and workers alone.

The AFL–CIO stated the following in arguing that the company-controlled secret ballots actually make the process less democratic:

People call the current National Labor Relations Board (NLRB) election system a secret ballot election—but in fact it's not like any democratic election held anywhere else in our society. It's really a management-controlled election process because corporations have all the power. They control the information workers can receive and routinely poison the process by intimidating, harassing, coercing and even firing people who try to organize unions. No employee has free choice after being browbeaten by a supervisor to oppose the union or being told they may lose their job and livelihood if workers vote for the union.

=== Opposition ===
Those who oppose card check argue it strips workers of their right to a secret ballot. They also argue that even though gathering a majority of card signers might imply that a secret ballot would be unnecessary, signers could be coerced to sign through intimidation and pressure; the same could also be said of employers in the period between sign-up and a secret ballot. The U.S. Chamber of Commerce, opposed the implementation of card check:

Under the existing law today, workers have a chance to vote for or against unionization in a private-ballot election that is federally supervised. Under Card Check, if more than 50% of workers at a facility sign a card, the government would have to certify the union, and a private ballot election would be prohibited--even if workers want one. By forcing workers to sign a card in public—instead of vote in private—card check opens the door to intimidation and coercion. Over 70% of voters agree that a private election is better than card check.

The National Restaurant Association lists three points in opposition to card check on its website.

1. A card-check process increases the risk of coercion. When a union tries to organize a workplace, employees sometimes face intimidation and pressure about how they should vote, from the union, management, or both. The best way to protect employees from coercion is through the continued use of a federally supervised, private-ballot process.

2. Private ballots are a basic American right. The entire American system is based on respect for individual liberty and democracy. If Congress passes this proposal, they will strip away the protections that federally protected, democratic elections provide for American workers.

3. An employee's decision to join a union should be made in private. Employees should not have to reveal to anyone—employers or unions—how they exercise their right to choose whether to organize with their co-workers in a union. Moving to a card-check process rather than a federally supervised election tramples on employee privacy. An employee’s decision to join a union should be made in private, protected from any coercion by unions, employers or co-workers.

Representative John Kline, R-Minn., in explaining his opposition to the EFCA:

It is beyond me how one can possibly claim that a system whereby everyone — your employer, your union organizer, and your co-workers—knows exactly how you vote on the issue of unionization gives an employee 'free choice' ... It seems pretty clear to me that the only way to ensure that a worker is 'free to choose' is to ensure that there's a private ballot, so that no one knows how you voted. I cannot fathom how we were about to sit there today and debate a proposal to take away a worker's democratic right to vote in a secret-ballot election and call it 'Employee Free Choice.'
