= Littler Mendelson =

American union avoidance law firm

Littler Mendelson, P.C.
- Headquarters: San Francisco, California, US
- No. of offices: 100
- No. of attorneys: 1,900
- Major practice areas: Labor and employment
- Key people: Erin A. Webber (president and managing director)
- Date founded: 1942
- Company type: Professional corporation
- Website: littler.com

Littler Mendelson P.C. (often known as Littler) (Note: The firm previously had additional named partners, and was known as Littler, Mendelson, Fastiff, Tichy & Mathiason in 1998.) is an American multinational law firm specializing in labor law. The company is known for its union busting practices, acting on behalf of business management against organized labor efforts, (Note: Sources describing Littler Mendelson as a union busting, union avoidance, or anti-union firm: Blanc, Eric (April 1, 2024). "Worker-Led Unionization Sweeps the US". International Labor and Working-Class History. 105. Cambridge University Press: 301–302. doi:10.1017/S0147547924000012. "Littler Mendelson, the country's most notorious union-busting law firm, sounded the alarm in a 2022 report"; Logan, John (August 8, 2013). "Employer Opposition in the US: Anti-Union Campaigning from the 1950s". Global Anti-Unionism: Nature, Dynamics, Trajectories and Outcomes. Palgrave Macmillan. p. 24. doi:10.1057/9781137319067_2. ISBN 978-1-137-31906-7. "Three decades later, the biggest union avoidance law firms in the nation – such as New York-based Jackson Lewis (which was created by former employees of Labor Relations Associates (LRA)), Chicago-based Seyfrath Shaw and San Francisco-based Littler Mendelson – all boasted several hundred lawyers specialising in the area, with dozens of offices throughout the country, and sometimes even an international presence."; Marshall, Jonathan (June 5, 1996). "Law Firm Cashes In by Aiding Employers". SFGate. Archived from the original on September 9, 2021.; Sainato, Michael (September 4, 2022). "Trader Joe's broke labor laws in effort to stop stores unionizing, workers say". The Guardian. "Trader Joe's also retained Littler Mendelson, a union avoidance law firm that Starbucks has also retained as dozens of stores around the US have unionized over the past year."; Gurley, Lauren (September 8, 2021). "'It's Almost Comical:' Starbucks Is Blatantly Trying to Crush Its Union". Vice. Archived from the original on September 15, 2024.; Schiffer, Zoë (April 25, 2022). "Apple Hires Anti-union Lawyers in Escalating Union Fight". The Verge. Archived from the original on April 25, 2022.) and is the largest law firm for union avoidance in the United States. Founded in 1942 in San Francisco, the firm expanded nationwide in the late 1990s and internationally in the 2010s, and has 100 offices in 28 countries.

Littler has advised its clients to use a variety of strategies to obstruct unionization, including captive audience meetings, anti-union messaging, and delaying union elections. The firm and its in-house lobbying group, the Workplace Policy Institute (WPI), have opposed laws and policies that would ease unionization and shield workers seeking union recognition from employer retaliation.

Littler has represented organisations including Amazon, Apple, Delta Air Lines, Nissan, Starbucks, Trader Joe's, Volkswagen, and the Wikimedia Foundation.

== History ==
Littler Mendelson was founded in the San Francisco Bay Area in 1942, when the National War Labor Board was active in mediating labor disputes, and dedicated its practice to advising employers on unionization and collective bargaining issues. Beginning in the 1960s, Littler pivoted away from union substitution (the act of providing non-union employees with similar benefits as union employees to discourage unionization) and started deploying more aggressive strategies to suppress union formation. The firm broadened its scope to encompass other areas of employment law in the 1970s in response to decreased union membership, a plan spearheaded by named partners Wesley Fastiff and Garry Mathiason. Littler remained local to the Bay Area until the 1990s, when it expanded throughout the US via mergers and acquisitions.

The firm created its International Practice Group in 2000 to handle employment issues that span multiple jurisdictions. In 2010, the firm announced an international labor and employment law office in Caracas, Venezuela; this office subsequently joined Ius Laboris in 2012. The firm opened two offices in Mexico under the name Littler, De la Vega y Conde, S.C. In October 2013, Littler combined with two Latin American law firms, adding a presence in four additional countries in the Latin American region – Colombia, Costa Rica, El Salvador, and Panama, – and creating a new entity named Littler Global. The firm continued expanding through Littler Global, opening offices in Puerto Rico, the Dominican Republic, Honduras, Peru, and Guatemala.

== Union busting ==
Littler has a reputation for union busting, and is the largest union avoidance firm in the US. It has counseled and defended companies including Amazon, Delta Air Lines, Starbucks, Trader Joe's, and Nissan against employees trying to unionize. In 2007, Littler stated that it helped employers implement "union prevention tools" and provided "union avoidance training programs". In 2015, Law Business Research described Littler as having an "'unrivalled reputation' in handling labour and employment matters across its US and global offices". Littler's attorneys have advertised that they help corporations "respond to efforts by labor unions and non-governmental organizations to discredit them through global campaigns".

At the Volkswagen Chattanooga Assembly Plant, Littler successfully petitioned the National Labor Relations Board (NLRB) to delay a union election. Under Littler's advisement, Volkswagen Group of America management disseminated anti-union messaging in flyers, newsletters, pre-shift meetings, and a captive audience meeting with Tennessee governor Bill Lee, which contributed to the plant workers opposing unionization by a close margin in 2019. The plant workers later unionized under United Auto Workers in 2024.

Starbucks hired over 110 Littler attorneys to counter Starbucks Workers United's unionization efforts initiated in mid-2021. With counsel from Littler, Starbucks implemented captive audience meetings, delivered anti-union messaging spam, restricted employees at union stores from obtaining pay raises, and accelerated hiring immediately before union elections. The company stalled union elections until December 2021 and had not negotiated a labor contract with any of its unionized stores as of June 2023, despite the union's 330 election wins at the time. According to the NLRB's May 2023 records, Littler and Starbucks (including a Starbucks subsidiary) have accumulated over 550 charges of unfair labor practices. The NLRB has verified approximately 350 of the charges and filed 100 complaints against Starbucks, as of June 2023.

Littler was hired by Apple in response to Apple Store staff in the US voting to unionize in 2022. Apple circulated talking points to managers (who had been coached by Littler) for use in captive audience meetings, implying that staff might lose career opportunities or flexibility in their working hours if the union plans went ahead. Similar talking points had also been used by Amazon and Starbucks as part of their anti-union drives.

In 2026, the Wikimedia Foundation retained Littler Mendelson to represent the foundation before the National Labor Relations Board after declining a request for voluntary recognition from Wiki Workers United, a labor union formed by employees of the Foundation and affiliated with the Communications Workers of America.

== Lobbying and policy views ==
In the 2000s, Littler published articles opposing the Employee Free Choice Act, a bill that would ease the use of the card check method for unionization and increase penalties against companies who retaliated against employees for attempting to unionize.

In 2012, Littler established its lobbying organization, the Workplace Policy Institute (WPI). The WPI is co-chaired by Maury Baskin, who repeatedly challenged labor regulations implemented by the United States Department of Labor and the NLRB during the Obama administration, including the persuader rule that required law firms such as Littler to publicly disclose when employers hired them for anti-union legal consulting services. In 2016, Littler and another law firm represented the National Association of Manufacturers and other plaintiffs in a lawsuit filed against the Department of Labor, resulting in the persuader rule being blocked by injunction.

The WPI unsuccessfully advocated against California Assembly Bill 5 in 2019, which reclassified many independent contractors as employees. In 2021, the WPI criticized the Protecting the Right to Organize Act, which would require employers to pay damages to employees when they fire them in violation of labor laws, for being more "punitive" than the National Labor Relations Act of 1935. After Rhode Island banned captive audience meetings in 2025 by prohibiting employers from retaliating against employees who decline to attend them, Littler claimed that the ban was "likely unconstitutional" and suggested its "more risk tolerant" clients could continue to hold captive audience meetings in contravention of state law because of their "tremendous value" for union busting.

Littler has advised employers against signing global framework agreements that govern employer activity during unionization, viewing the agreements as "ammunition" for labor unions that would interfere with anti-union strategies.

== Former employees ==
- Alan D. Cohn, former Assistant Secretary of the United States Department of Homeland Security
- Melissa Lafsky, author and blogger
- Sonja Henning, WNBA player
- William Emanuel, National Labor Relations Board Member
- Ryan Crosswell, former assistant US attorney

== See also ==
- Anti-union organizations in the United States
