= TaskUs =

American outsourcing company

Task Us
- Company type: Public
- Traded as: Nasdaq: TASK
- Industry: Outsourcing
- Founded: 2008; 18 years ago in Santa Monica, California, United States
- Founders: Bryce Maddock, Jaspar Weir
- Headquarters: New Braunfels, Texas, United States
- Key people: Bryce Maddock (CEO); Jaspar Weir (President); Balaji Sekar (CFO); Stephan Daoust (COO)
- Services: Content moderation
- Revenue: ▼US$227.5 million (2024)
- Operating income: ▲US$23.56 million (2024)
- Net income: ▲US$11.71 million (2024)
- Total assets: ▲US$874.5 million (2024)
- Total equity: ▲US$454.6 million (2024)
- Number of employees: 49,600 (2024)
- Subsidiaries: Task Verse
- Website: www.taskus.com

Task Us is an American multinational outsourcing company that handles content moderation, customer experience, artificial intelligence, operations and risk & response services for companies around the world, including Facebook and DoorDash.

== History ==
Task Us was founded by Bryce Maddock and Jaspar Weir, best friends since high school, in 2008 in Santa Monica, California. The two had co-founded other companies before starting Task Us.

The company was originally conceived as a task-based virtual assistant platform for start-ups, based in the Philippines. Conversations with potential clients indicated a need for more comprehensive support and Task Us modified their model accordingly. Early funding included $15 million from Navegar, a private equity fund in the Philippines, and a $14 million loan from Bridge Bank. The Blackstone Group invested $250 million in 2018.

In 2017, Entrepreneur Magazine listed Task Us as #3 on their Entrepreneur 360 list.

The company had its initial public offering in June 2021; it is traded on NASDAQ as TASK. Approximately 30% of the company's revenue is from providing content moderation for Facebook, and about 12% is from DoorDash. Task Us was originally structured as a limited liability company. This meant that it distributed phantom stock to employees before its 2021 IPO.

In 2022, a class-action lawsuit was brought against Task Us for a data breach they did not bring to the attention of customers. That same year, the company was also accused of improper revenue disclosure and lack of clarity regarding its work with Facebook. Several components of the claim were dismissed by a New York federal judge. Task Us moved to dismiss this claim against them in February 2023.

That same year, Task Us made its first acquisition after going public by buying heloo, a Croatia-based digital customer service provider. Also that year, Task Us was named North America Company of the Year by Frost & Sullivan.

In 2023, Task Us introduced an AI platform, TaskGPT.

== Operations ==
Task Us moved its headquarters to San Antonio, Texas in 2017, then to New Braunfels, Texas in 2018. Its revenue for the first quarter of 2024 was $227.5 million.

The company employs a total of 47,000 employees in 13 locations; the company's principal operations are in the Philippines.

Approximately 30% of the company's revenue is from providing content moderation for Facebook, and about 12% is from DoorDash.

Other customers include Coinbase (beginning in 2017), Netflix, Zoom (beginning in 2020), Whisper, Tinder, AutoDesk, and Uber (beginning in 2013).
