= Lin Farley =

American writer and feminist

- Born: December 14, 1942 (age 83)
- Occupations: Author and journalist
- Known for: Coining the phrase "sexual harassment" and calling attention to the issue of sexual harassment of women in the workplace

Lin Farley (born December 14, 1942) is an American author, journalist and feminist. She was a leader in calling attention to the problems faced by women in the workforce, in particular sexual harassment.

== Sexual harassment ==
In 1974, she was hired by Cornell University as director of the university's Women's Section and lecturer for a field study course called Women and Work. In a 1974 consciousness raising discussion connected with that course, she began to realize the extent of the problem that she later termed "sexual harassment". As the women in the class described their experiences in the workplace she noticed a pattern: every woman there had either quit or been fired from a job because they had been made so uncomfortable by the behavior of men. She discovered that this phenomenon of male harassment and intimidation of female workers had not been described in the literature and was not publicly recognized as a problem, although she continued to hear it described by women from all walks of life.

In 1975, inspired by the case of Carmita Wood, an administrative assistant to Cornell professor Boyce McDaniel, the group at Cornell formed the anti-harassment organization Working Women United. Wood had resigned after she developed physical symptoms due to the stress of fighting off McDaniel's persistent sexual advances. After Cornell denied her unemployment compensation, Wood approached the Human Affairs Office, which was staffed by Farley and two other committed feminists, Susan Meyer and Karen Sauvigné.

In April 1975, she testified before the New York City Human Rights Commission Hearings on Women and Work, led by Eleanor Holmes Norton. She defined sexual harassment as "unwanted sexual advances against women employees by male supervisors, bosses, foremen or managers." She gave examples: "It often means that a woman is hired because she is pretty, regardless of her qualifications; that a woman's job security is eternally dependent on how well she pleases her boss, and he often thinks sexual companionship is part of the job description; and that women are fired because they have aged or they are too independent or they say 'no' to sexual byplay."

A New York Times reporter who heard her testimony wrote about it, and by the end of 1975 her message had reached a national audience. Government agencies began to recognize sexual harassment as a problem to be addressed. Norton's Human Right's Commission added language to their affirmative action agreements guaranteeing "protection to male and female employees alike against unfair abuse of sexual privacy". Over the following decades Farley gave numerous public and academic presentations on the topic, and served as a consultant to the U.S. Department of Labor, the AFL-CIO, civil rights organizations and women's study programs.

She wrote a book, Sexual Shakedown: The Sexual Harassment of Women on the Job, published by McGraw-Hill in 1978 and in a paperback version by Warner Books in 1980. In it she traced the history of sexual harassment as a longstanding issue and gave contemporary examples, such as help-wanted advertisements implying that acceptance of sexual interaction was part of the job description. The book established sexual harassment as an important topic on the feminist agenda. The Christian Science Monitor said the book was "an overdue alert to the sexual harassment of working women by male employers which starkly reveals the emotional and physical degradations inflicted on women in the exploitive politics of power at their most base."

In 1981, she collaborated on the 33-minute documentary The Workplace Hustle, produced by Woody Clark and Al Brito and narrated by Ed Asner. Farley was a consultant and also appeared in the film. It was intended as a training film for workplaces, and it was widely used for that purpose by government agencies as well as corporations like Xerox and Hewlett-Packard. It won awards at the San Francisco Film Festival and the New York Film Festival.

== Background and personal life ==
Her parents, Vincent and Beatrice Farley, were working-class people; both were shop stewards in their respective unions. Her parents had little education, but read widely. She later commented, "My mother had a hard life and all her dreams were stifled. I know that I became a feminist and wrote Sexual Shakedown in part because I had become sensitized from her experiences as a working woman." She attended local public schools in New Jersey and then in Downey, California. During her senior year she was elected the Youth Governor of both the California YMCA Youth & Government (Y&G) Model Legislature Program, and the American Legion Auxiliary's Girls State. She was the 12th and first female Youth Governor for California's Y&G Program. She started and dropped out of several colleges before going to the University of Southern California on a journalism scholarship. Before graduation she went to work for the Associated Press in New York as a reporter and feature writer.

She taught at Cornell from 1974 to 1976, then became a freelance consultant on women's issues while writing her book. She received a master's degree in Eastern and Western Psychology from Naropa University in 1985. She earned a PhD in Eastern Psychology from the California Institute of Integral Studies in 1993; her thesis was titled "The secret world of men: Men's attitudes, beliefs, fantasies and desires with regard to women and children".

She lived in Taipei for three years while writing for the English-language publication Free China Journal. Returning to the United States, she became a consultant to computer companies on human factors engineering.
