= Warehouse Workers United =

Warehouse Workers United (WWU) is an organization “committed to working with warehouse workers to improve the quality of life and jobs in Southern California's Inland Empire.”

== History ==
Warehouse Workers United was formed in 2009 as a campaign of the Change to Win Federation. Since that time, WWU has been involved in, among other things, educating workers, supporting strikes, and providing assistance for workers' lawsuits against businesses engaged in transportation and warehousing.

== Choice of location ==
Warehouse Workers United is based in the Inland Empire region of Southern California, which has one of the largest concentration of warehouses and distribution centers in the world. These warehouses and distribution centers are largely fed by container ships that dock at two of the busiest posts in the US, the Port of Los Angeles and the Port of Long Beach. Once containers are offloaded from these ships, many are taken to warehouses and distribution centers in the Inland Empire for eventual redistribution to stores and factories located throughout the Southwest US. An estimated 108,000 people work within the logistics sector in the Inland Empire, and the earnings of those working within warehouses and distribution centers is only about $22,000 per year.

== Notable Activities ==
In 2011, workers supported by WWU filed a lawsuit against three logistics companies alleging the companies "cheated workers of their wages, refused to allow them meal breaks and resorted to retaliatory measures if they complained."

In 2012, Cal/OSHA, prompted by workers supported by WWU, "issued dozens of citations to National Distribution Centers and its temporary staffing agency, Tri-State Staffing. Almost half the citations are for alleged serious violations."

In 2013, workers supported by WWU won a $4.7 million settlement from Schneider Logistics (a division of Schneider National)over claims Schneider "shorted employees on overtime and regular pay and denied them rest and meal breaks to which they were legally entitled for five years."

In 2014, a U.S. District Court judge allowed a class-action lawsuit filed by WWU-supported workers against Schneider Logistics and Walmart to go forward.

== External sources ==
WWU website
