= NLRB v. Gissel Packing Co. =

NLRB v. Gissel Packing Co., Inc.
- Supreme Court of the United States

Argued March 26, 1969 Decided June 16, 1969
- Full case name: National Labor Relations Board v. Gissel Packing Co., Inc.
- Citations: 395 U.S. 575 (more)
- Argument: Oral argument

Holding
- 1. To obtain recognition as the exclusive bargaining representative under the Act, a union can establish majority status by possession of cards signed by a majority of the employees authorizing the union to represent them for bargaining purposes.; 2. The NLRB's rules for controlling card solicitation are adequate safeguards against union misrepresentation and coercion where the cards are clear and unambiguous on their face.; 3. The issuance of a bargaining order is an appropriate remedy where an employer who has rejected a card majority has committed unfair labor practices which have made the holding of a fair election unlikely, or which have undermined a union's majority, caused an election to be set aside, and made the holding of a fair rerun election unlikely. Pp. 395 U. S. 610-616.; 4. An employer's free speech right to communicate with his employees is firmly established, and cannot be infringed by a union or by the NLRB, and 8(c) merely implements the First Amendment by requiring that the expression of "any views, argument or opinion" shall not be "evidence of an unfair labor practice," so long as such expression contains "no threat of reprisal or force or promise of benefit" in violation of § 8(a)(1).

Court membership
- Chief Justice Earl Warren Associate Justices Hugo Black · William O. Douglas; John M. Harlan II · William J. Brennan Jr. Potter Stewart · Byron White; Thurgood Marshall

Case opinion
- Majority: Warren

Laws applied
- National Labor Relations Act

NLRB v. Gissel Packing Co., Inc., 395 U.S. 575 (1969) was a unanimous United States Supreme Court case clarifying the application of the National Labor Relations Act after the Taft-Hartley Amendments, particularly the application of union authorization cards.

The Taft-Hartley Amendments repealed the provision of the National Labor Relations Act that allowed the NLRB to certify unions without an election. In the Joy Silk decision, the NLRB announced that it would order employers to recognize and bargain with unions if the general counsel established that the union represented a majority of workers in the appropriate bargaining unit, the union request recognition, the employer denied the request for recognition and lacked good faith doubt of the union's majority status, and the employer tried to disrupt the union's majority status by committing unfair labor practices. This doctrine provided a strong incentive for employers to avoid committing unfair labor practices during organizing campaigns.

After the Court abandoned Joy Silk, it announced its new doctrine in Gissel, which hinges on whether employer unfair labor practices make a fair election unlikely or impossible, a more speculative test than the Joy Silk doctrine. First, the Court upheld the board's authority to remedy an employer's unfair labor practices by ordering the employer to recognize and bargain with a union based solely on authorization cards from a majority of employees. So-called "Gissel" orders are issued when the atmosphere has been so tainted by an employer's unfair labor practices that a fair rerun election is unlikely. Second, the Court held that the NLRB retains the authority to force an employer to bargain with the union even when the union no longer possesses a majority of employees at the time of the bargaining order.

Since the decision in Gissel, federal circuit courts have added additional burdens on the NLRB's authority to issue Gissel orders.
