= Joy Silk =

U.S. labor relations policy in effect from 1949 to 1966

Joy Silk was a doctrine of the US National Labor Relations Board (NLRB) in effect from 1949 to 1966. The doctrine arose from Joy Silk Mills, Inc., 85 NLRB 1263 (1949). The policy was modified in 1966, then in 1969 replaced by the Gissel doctrine following the Supreme Court case NLRB v. Gissel Packing Co., Inc. Joy Silk held that "if a union provides evidence that a majority of workers want to unionize", the employer must recognize the union unless they have "good faith doubt" regarding that evidence. Further, "if there's an unfair labor practice, meaning the employer broke the law, then it is presumed that the workers wanted to join a union".

Jennifer Abruzzo has proposed reinstating the Joy Silk standard, which would make it easier for workers to unionize. According to law professor Risa Lieberwitz, "Bringing Joy Silk back would be a doctrine that more fully respects workers' rights to unionize."

In 2023 in response to the company Cemex having been found guilty of two dozen illegal labor practices, by interfering with a union election, the NLRB reinstated parts of Joy Silk. Under the new policy if a majority of workers demonstrate support for a union, the company must recognize them or ask the NLRB to conduct an election. However, if they commit unfair labor practices, the union will automatically be recognized and the company will be required to bargain.
