= Unionization =

Process by which a union forms

Unionization is the creation and growth of modern trade unions. Trade unions were often seen as a left-wing, socialist concept, whose popularity has increased during the 19th century when a rise in industrial capitalism saw a decrease in motives for up-keeping workers' rights.

Workers usually create unions when they face a certain struggle within their industry. They tend to organize themselves by sector of employment and may join a general union to represent employees in all sectors. Different unions may vary in how much emphasis is placed on participation, union leadership, aims, and techniques, depending on the impact of their action.

On average, blue-collar workers tend to be more unionized than white-collar workers.

== Motives for unionization ==
Modern trade unions form due to many different reasons, mainly due to changes in a country's economy or decreasing demand for labour in a specific industry. Workers usually form unions when they feel that the fact that they do not have a say in the workplace threatens their job security, which in turn affects their economical position.

=== Bureaucratization ===
Members are more likely to unionize when they collectively have problems with their workplace, however this leaves out workers who do not have much of a high standing in the environment.

Different workers may have different goals, which may include either promotions or a higher pay. Unions attracted disadvantaged workers to enable collective bargaining power between them with employers to negotiate better wages, benefits, and employment terms.

There have been some studies suggesting workers join unions due to social pressures, however there have also been studies that suggest the opposite. As such, the likelihood of social pressures effecting workers joining a union likely varies from environment to environment.

== Opposition ==
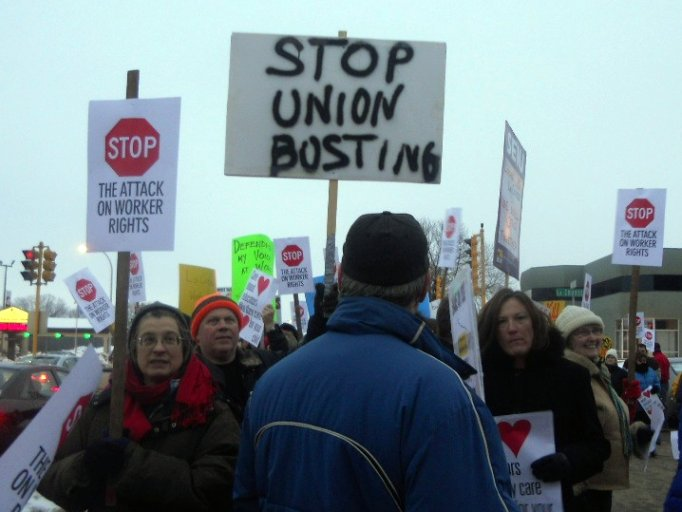
Union activists protest Scott Walker's anti-union legislation in Wisconsin in 2011.

Company management usually disapprove of unions due to collective action by workers cutting into a company's profit shares. Although, in the United States, it is illegal for an employer to interfere with workers' right to unionize, workers may sometimes feel agitated about joining a union if disapproval is expected from employers, as there may be an underlying belief that an employee's social standing with an employer may be tarnished.

Employers who take part in actively combating the process of unionization or the efforts of the union are engaging in union busting.

== Forms of organization ==
Union membership tend to be organized by either their industry, ultimate goal, or employer.

=== Craft unionism ===
In craft unionism, workers are organized by their job or profession. Unions that belong to this group tend to focus on improving the conditions of a particular industry, for example when the Writers Guild of America struck on behalf of its writers.

=== Industrial unionism ===
In industrial unionism, workers are organized together regardless of their job or profession, where a higher membership count gives a union more influence across many different industries.

=== Solidarity unionism ===
In solidarity unionism, workers who wish to directly attempt to take action without any form of mediation are organized together.

== Types of unionization models ==
Different unionization models are used to guide a union's efforts to reach its goals.

=== Servicing model ===
The service model is where union organizers use legal and other types of resources that are not affiliated with the employer or workforce.

=== Organizing model ===
The organizing model is a model developed in the United States that re thinks union organizers as being teachers and mentors that encourage and instruct union members in carrying out their own activism. This is in contrast to the Service Model of Organizing, where the union is charged with settling disputes and solving problems. The goal with the organizing model is to encourage union members to be more active and engaged in their union.

== Effects of unionization ==
=== In relation to gender ===
According to a study conducted in 1992, conventional unionization organization strategies were most applicable towards men working in the manufacturing sector, forcing those who were not affiliated with such to initiate contact with a union. Women were more likely than men to desire a form of unionization, however they were recorded as less likely to join a union.

=== In relation to productivity ===
Early industrial relations researchers believed unionization might safeguard employment by fighting technological and mechanical advances. Recent researchers developed dynamic union-firm bargaining approaches. Monopoly unions can boost salaries and appropriate quasi-rents from employers' capital, but others predict that firms would decrease capital investment to prevent appropriation, lowering productivity.

Unionization has been demonstrated to be associated with greater employee retention, even when unionized employees experience greater amounts of dissatisfaction in the workplace. This is associated with the fact that employees experiencing dissatisfaction will be able to voice their concerns more effectively through the use of the union.

== Rate of unionization by country ==
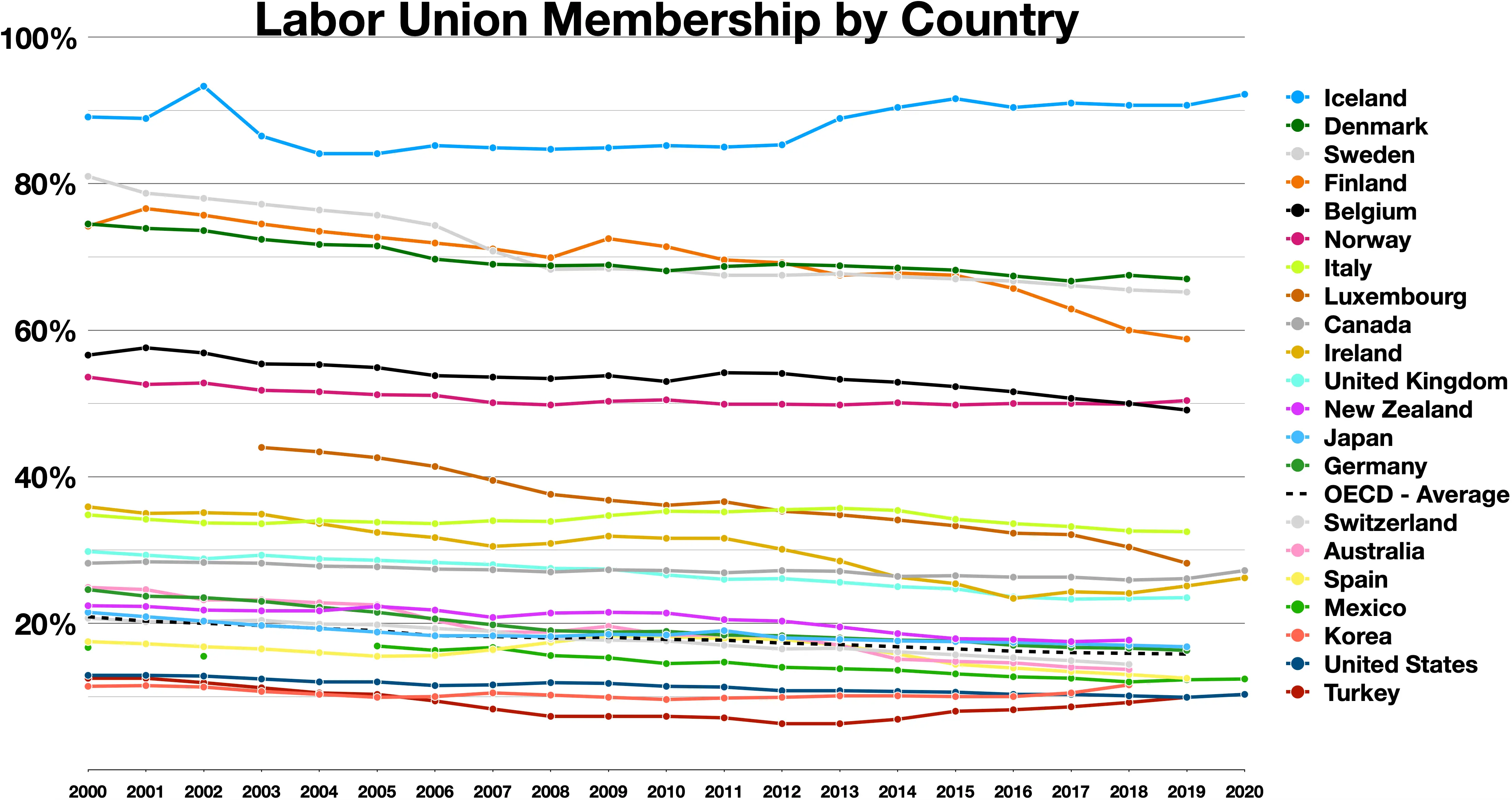
Labor union membership by country

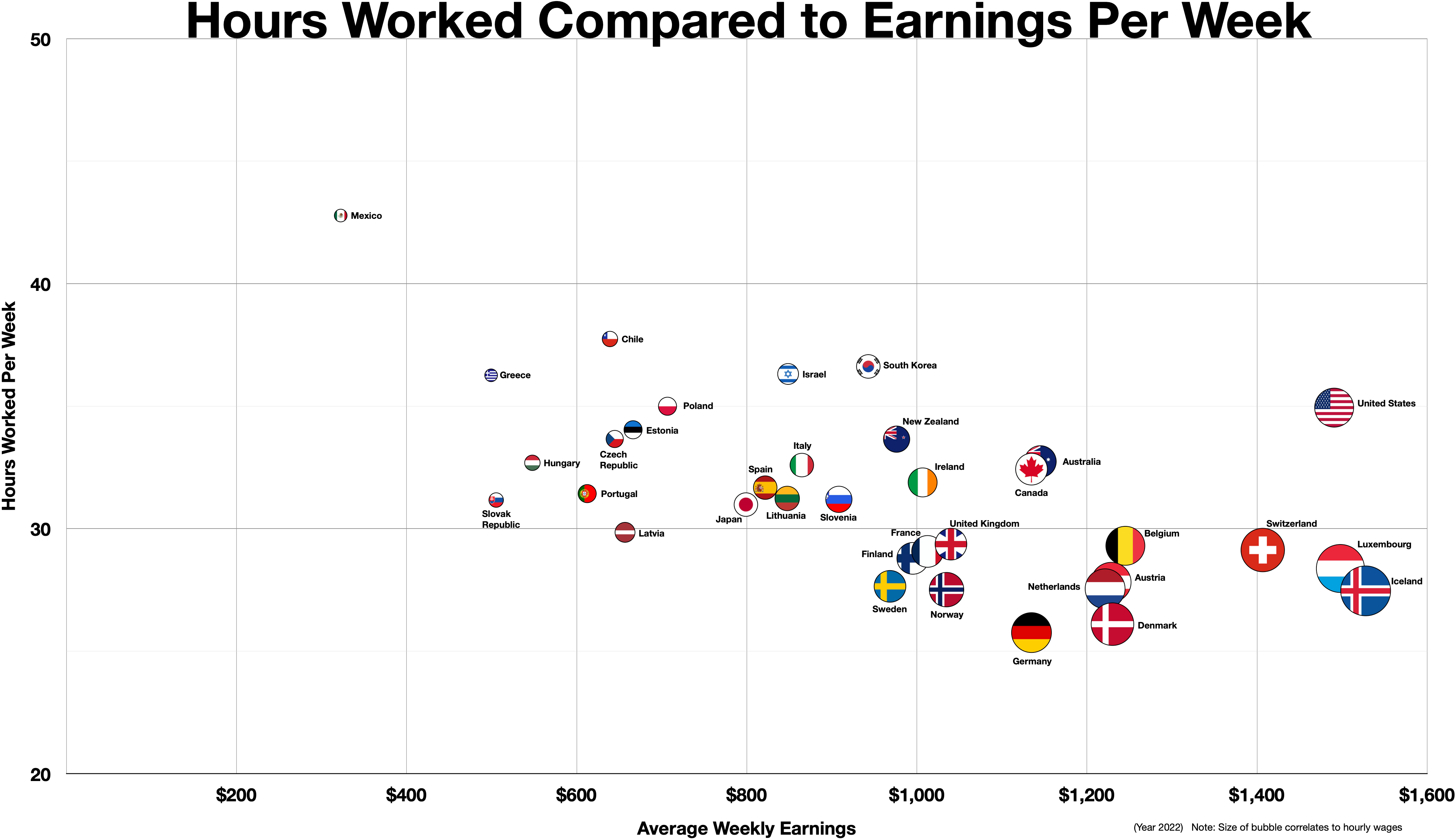
Hours Worked Compared to Earnings Per Week (OECD)

The rate of unionization in a country is measured through both the number of workers represented by a union as well as the share of workers represented by unions in a country. This is due to that although more workers may be joining unions, industries represented by unions are increasing at a faster rate.

=== Canada ===
The rate of members represented by unions in Canada has fallen significantly in the past four decades, dropping from 37.6% in 1981 to slightly less than 29% by 2014. The union movement in Canada has become increasingly concentrated in the public sector. Most workers in Canada have the right to unionize their workplace, but certain categories of workers are ineligible to unionize, such as independent contractors.

=== India ===
The Indian National Trade Union Congress was formed in 1947 after Indian independence in the same year, and is the oldest trade union federation in India. Unions are known to have political connections, and are sometimes used to project political influence on both workers and political parties.

=== Russia and the Soviet Union ===
Soviet trade unions, administered by the All-Union Central Council of Trade Unions, date back to the Russian Revolution of 1905, fifteen years before the establishment of the Soviet Union. Their relationships with industrial management, the Communist Party, and the Soviet government were complex due to a requirement in labour.

The Federation of Independent Trade Unions of Russia (FNPR) is Russia's largest post-Soviet national trade union center, with 28-31.5 million members and is widely recognized as the successor to the Soviet era system.

=== United States ===
The earliest recorded workers' strike through a newly-formed solidarity union was recorded in 1768 when New York journeymen tailors protested against a wage reduction. Local craft unions formed and demanded shorter workdays and job-conscious orientation. Trade unionism emerged in the 19th century, primarily involving skilled workers.

Although the annual rate of unionization in the United States is increasing, it has one of the lowest unionization rates in the developed world. The effects of unionization are not heavily researched, drastically reducing the known effects of unionization and therefore reducing the number of workers who know about unionization.

== See also ==
- Amazon worker organization
- Google worker organization
- Starbucks unions
- Unionization in the tech sector
