= Bargaining unit =

Unit of labor representation

A bargaining unit, in labor relations, is a group of employees with a clear and identifiable community of interests who under US law are represented, or are eligible to be represented, by a single labor union in collective bargaining and other dealings with management.

Examples are all non-management professors, all law enforcement professionals, all blue-collar workers, or all clerical and administrative employees at a given employer. The organizing committee proposes to the National Labor Relations Board the list of workers it considers to share a community of interest which the employer can request to amend. The NLRB makes the final determination of the correct size. Geographic location and the number of facilities included in bargaining units may be issues during representation cases.

The size of a company does not relate to the size of a bargaining unit as there can be multiple communities of interests at a single company. Bargaining units must consist of at least two employees.
