= Sexual harassment in the workplace in the United States =

Form of workplace harassment in the US

Sexual harassment in the workplace in US labor law has been considered a form of discrimination on the basis of sex in the United States since the mid-1970s. There are two forms of sexual harassment recognized by United States law: quid pro quo sexual harassment (requiring an employee to tolerate sexual harassment to keep their job, receive a tangible benefit, or avoid punishment) and behavior that creates a hostile work environment (persistent sexual behavior that unreasonably interferes with an employee's ability to work). It has been noted that a number of the early sexual harassment cases were brought by African American women and girls.

== History ==
The term sexual harassment was popularized following a consciousness-raising session led by Lin Farley as part of a Cornell University program on women in the workplace, and the term entered popular use in 1975.

A number of the original sexual harassment cases were pursued on behalf of black women and girls.

United States law recognizes two forms of sexual harassment:

- Quid pro quo sexual harassment: an employee is required to tolerate sexual harassment in exchange for employment, a raise or job benefit, or promotion.
- Hostile work environment: sexual harassment in the workplace results in an offensive work environment or unreasonably interferes an employee's work performance.

=== Civil Rights Act of 1964 ===
In the United States, the Civil Rights Act of 1964 prohibits employment discrimination based on race, sex, color, national origin or religion. Initially only intended to combat sex discrimination against people based on sex alone, (42 U.S.C. § 2000e-2) the prohibition of sex discrimination now extends to discrimination based on sexuality and transgender identity. This discrimination occurs when the sex of the worker, the worker's sexual preference, or the worker's sex at birth, is made a condition of employment (e.g., all female waitpersons or male carpenters) or where this is a job requirement that does not mention sex but ends up preventing many more persons of one sex than the other from the job (such as height and weight limits). This act only applies to employers with 15 or more employees.

=== Equal Employment Opportunity Commission regulations (1980) ===
In 1980, the Equal Employment Opportunity Commission (EEOC) issued regulations defining sexual harassment and stating it was a form of sex discrimination prohibited by the Civil Rights Act of 1964.

=== Civil Rights Act of 1991 ===
The Civil Rights Act of 1991 added provisions to Title VII protections including expanding the rights of women to sue and collect compensatory and punitive damages for sexual discrimination or harassment.

=== Case Law ===
==== Barnes v Train (1974) ====
Barnes v. Train (1974) is commonly viewed as the first sexual harassment case in America, even though the term "sexual harassment" was not used. Paulette Barnes, an African American woman, was a payroll clerk who worked for the Environmental Protection Agency. She brought the case after losing her job for refusing the advances of a male supervisor. The case was dismissed, but was appealed in Barnes v Costle (1977).

==== Williams v. Saxbe (1976) ====
In 1976, Williams v. Saxbe was the first case in a U.S. District Court to establish that quid pro quo sexual harassment constitutes sex discrimination under the Civil Rights Act of 1964. A male supervisor was found to have retaliated against Diane R. Williams, an African American woman, by firing her after she refused to have sex with him. The court found that it was a form of sex discrimination when a condition of employment is to submit to the sexual advances of a superior. Additionally, there was evidence that other female employees had been subjected to similar conditions. Judge Charles Richey ruled that Diane Williams' supervisor, who was an employee under William B. Saxbe, had only required women to submit to his advances, which created an artificial barrier to employment for one gender but not the other.

Judge Richey's decision received a lot of media attention, including stories in multiple national newspapers. A lot of this attention was critical of the decision, and focused on a footnote Judge Richey included in the Memorandum Opinion. This footnote indicated that sexual harassment from a supervisor who is bisexual cannot be considered sex discrimination under Title VII if both male and female employees are subject to the harassment.

Williams' case was appealed multiple times, and it took around eight years for her to win. Judge Richey granted Williams $19,147 to make up for lost pay.

Williams v Saxbe was the first U.S. District Court decision to recognize quid pro quo sexual harassment. In response to the findings of this case, several earlier decisions against sex discrimination in lower courts were reversed on appeal, including Barnes v Train.

==== Barnes v. Costle (1977) ====
Although Barnes v. Train (1974) was initially dismissed, Paulette Barnes won on appeal in Barnes v. Costle (1977). During this case, the District of Columbia Court of Appeals ruled it was sex discrimination for a woman to suffer tangible employment losses (for example losing her job) for refusing to submit to requests for sexual favors. The appeals ruling was based in part on the Williams v. Saxbe (1976) decision. The court also found that companies are liable for not stopping sexual harassment if they know it is being conducted by supervisors. As part of the ruling of Barnes v. Costle, Barnes received around $18,000 for back pay and the loss of promotions.

==== Meritor Savings Bank v. Vinson (1986) ====
In the 1986 case of Meritor Savings Bank v. Vinson, the Supreme Court first recognized "sexual harassment" as a violation of Title VII, established the standards for analyzing whether the conduct was welcome and levels of employer liability, and that speech or conduct in itself can create a "hostile environment". This case filed by Mechelle Vinson ruled that the sexual conduct between the subordinate and supervisor could not be deemed voluntary due to the hierarchical relationship between the two positions in the workplace. Following the ruling of Meritor Savings Bank v. Vinson, reported sexual harassment cases grew from 10 cases being registered by the EEOC per year before 1986 to 624 case being reported in the subsequent following year. This number of reported cases to the EEOC rose to 2,217 in 1990 and then 4,626 by 1995.

==== Ellison v. Brady (1991) ====
The case of Ellison v. Brady resulted in rejecting the reasonable person standard in favor of the "reasonable woman standard" which allowed for cases to be analyzed from the perspective of the complainant and not the defendant.

==== Jenson v. Eveleth Taconite Co. (1991) ====
Also in 1991, Jenson v. Eveleth Taconite Co. became the first sexual harassment case to be given class action status paving the way for others.

Seven years later, in 1998, through that same case, new precedents were established that increased the limits on the "discovery" process in sexual harassment cases, that then allowed psychological injuries from the litigation process to be included in assessing damages awards.

==== Faragher v. City of Boca Raton, Florida, and Burlington v. Ellerth (1998) ====
In the same year, the courts concluded in Faragher v. City of Boca Raton, Florida, and Burlington v. Ellerth, that employers are liable for harassment by their employees. These cases solidified what would later be known as the Faragher-Ellerth affirmative defense, available to employers when the harassed employee suffered no tangible employment action. To avail itself of this defense, the employer must show 1. that the employer exercised reasonable care to prevent and correct promptly any sexually harassing behavior, and 2. the plaintiff employee unreasonably failed to take advantage of any preventive or corrective opportunities provided by the employer or to avoid harm otherwise. In 2018 the Third Circuit Court of Appeals narrowed the Faragher-Ellerth defense by holding that harassed employees who neither report the conduct nor suffer an adverse employment action may still potentially prevail in sexual harassment lawsuits.

==== Oncale v. Sundowner Offshore Services (1998) ====
Moreover, Oncale v. Sundowner Offshore Services set the precedent for same-sex harassment, and sexual harassment without motivation of "sexual desire", stating that any discrimination based on sex is actionable so long as it places the victim in an objectively disadvantageous working condition, regardless of the gender of either the victim, or the harasser.

==== Burlington Northern & Santa Fe Railway Co. v. White (2006) ====
In the 2006 case of Burlington Northern & Santa Fe Railway Co. v. White, the standard for retaliation against a sexual harassment complainant was revised to include any adverse employment decision or treatment that would be likely to dissuade a "reasonable worker" from making or supporting a charge of discrimination.

==== Astra USA v. Bildman (2009) ====
In Astra USA v. Bildman, 914 N.E.2d 36 (Mass. 2009), applying New York's faithless servant doctrine, the court held that a company's employee who had engaged in financial misdeeds and sexual harassment must "forfeit all of his salary and bonuses for the period of disloyalty." The court held that this was the case even if the employee "otherwise performed valuable services," and that the employee was not entitled to recover restitution for the value of those other services.

==== Reeves v. C.H. Robinson Worldwide, Inc. (2010) ====
The 2010 case, Reeves v. C.H. Robinson Worldwide, Inc. ruled that a hostile work environment can be created in a workplace where sexually explicit language and pornography are present. A hostile workplace may exist based upon the treatment of employees as a group, even if it is not targeted at any particular employee.

=== Forced arbitration ===
In the 2002 EEOC v. Waffle House Inc. United States Supreme Court ruling, it was held that arbitration agreements could not prevent the U.S. Equal Employment Opportunity Commission (EEOC) from pursuing victim-specific relief in litigation on behalf of an employee who files a timely charge of discrimination.

In 2022, the U.S. Congress passed the Ending Forced Arbitration of Sexual Assault and Sexual Harassment Act, which excludes these types of complaints from contracts with forced arbitration clauses, including retroactively. The law was championed by Gretchen Carlson, who also opposes the use of non-disclosure agreements to shield perpetrators. It would be officially signed into law by U.S. President Joe Biden on March 3, 2022.

== Prevalence ==
During 2007 alone, the U.S. Equal Employment Opportunity Commission and related state agencies received 12,510 new charges of sexual harassment on the job.

From 2010 through 2016, men made approximately 17% of sexual harassment complaints filed with the EEOC.

In a 2017 MSN poll it was found that 31% of people in the U.S have been sexually harassed in the workplace; 45% of women said they were sexually harassed and 15% percent of men said they were.

In 2026, a survey of 2,043 U.S. employees found that 55% of employees either experienced or witnessed workplace misconduct in 2025.

=== Sexual harassment in government ===
The California legislature in Sacramento is known to have paid at least $850,000 in sexual harassment settlements in the period 1996–2017, though the New York Times notes often settlements are unknown to the public because of the terms of the settlements themselves. The U.S. Congress paid $17 million between the 1990s and 2017 in settlements for sexual harassment and for discrimination.

== Mandatory workplace training ==
Several States require organizations based in the area to provide mandatory sexual harassment training to their employees.

=== California ===
California requires organizations with more than 5 employees to provide a written sexual harassment policy as well as an interactive training (either in-person or online) by January 1, 2021. This is an expansion of a 2005 law that required organizations with more than 50 employees to provide training to supervisors only. All employees and contractors (including temporary and seasonal employees) based in the state must go through the training within six months of hire or promotion and every two years thereafter.

=== Illinois ===
All Illinois organizations must provide a policy as well as a sexual harassment prevention training to their employees, starting in 2020. The in-person or online training must be taught every year to each employee.

=== New York State ===
New York was the first State to enact laws regarding mandatory annual harassment training in the workplace. The State requires each organization to provide a written policy. It also requires the employer to provide in-person or online interactive training to employees and contractors based in the state. New York City employees have to enroll in the training every year.

Connecticut, Delaware, and Maine have also passed laws mandating sexual harassment training for employers.

== See also ==
- US labor law
- Sexual harassment
- Hostile work environment
- Job interview
- Sex discrimination
- Anita Hill
- Melvil Dewey
