= Frances McDormand on screen and stage =

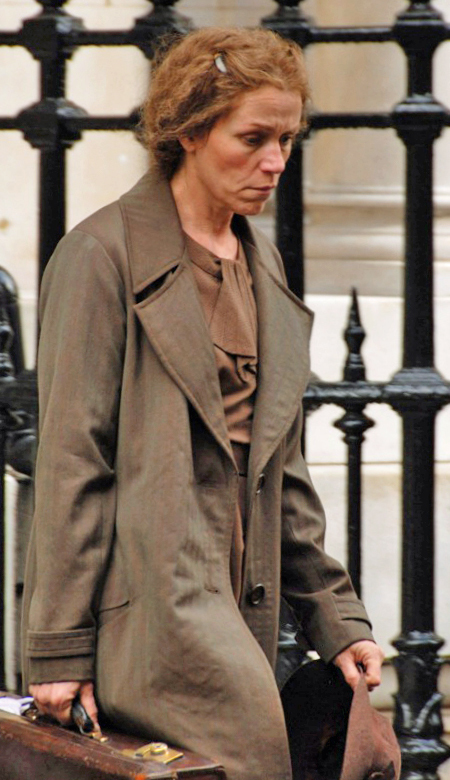
McDormand on the set of Miss Pettigrew Lives for a Day in 2007

Frances McDormand is an American actress and film producer who made her film debut in the Coen brothers' neo-noir Blood Simple (1984) and also made her Broadway debut in the revival Awake and Sing! in the same year. In 1985, she starred in the crime drama series Hunter and played a police officer on the procedural drama Hill Street Blues. For her performance as a sheriff's wife in Mississippi Burning (1988), she received a nomination for the Academy Award for Best Supporting Actress. In the same year, she was nominated for the Tony Award for Best Actress in a Play for playing Stella Kowalski in the revival A Streetcar Named Desire.

McDormand received critical acclaim and won her first Academy Award for Best Actress for her portrayal of a pregnant Minnesotan police chief in the Coen brothers' black comedy Fargo. In the same year, she played a psychiatrist in legal thriller Primal Fear. In 1997, McDormand garnered a nomination for the Primetime Emmy Award for Outstanding Supporting Actress in a Limited Series or Movie for her role as a mechanic in the television film Hidden in America. She was nominated for the Best Supporting Actress Oscar for her performance as an overprotective mother in Almost Famous (2000).

McDormand starred with Charlize Theron in both drama North Country and science fiction action film Æon Flux in 2005. For the former, McDormand received a nomination for the Best Supporting Actress Oscar. She won the Tony Award for Best Actress in a Play for her performance as a single mother in Good People (2011). McDormand garnered critical acclaim and the Primetime Emmy Award for Outstanding Lead Actress in a Limited Series or Movie and Screen Actors Guild Award for Outstanding Performance by a Female Actor in a Miniseries or Television Movie for playing the title character of an abrasive schoolteacher in Olive Kitteridge (2014), which she also produced.

McDormand won the BAFTA Award for Best Actress in a Leading Role, the Screen Actors Guild Award for Outstanding Performance by a Female Actor in a Leading Role, and her second Best Actress Oscar for her role as a mother seeking justice in the Martin McDonagh-directed crime drama Three Billboards Outside Ebbing, Missouri (2017). For her performance as a vandwelling nomad in the Chloe Zhao-directed 2020 drama Nomadland, she received her third Best Actress Oscar and second BAFTA for Best Actress. She also produced the film and received both the Academy Award for Best Picture and the BAFTA Award for Best Film.

== Film ==
Year	Title	Role(s)	Notes	Ref(s)
1984	Blood Simple	Abby		
1985	Crimewave	Nun		
1987	Raising Arizona	Dot		
1988	Mississippi Burning	Mrs. Pell		
1989	Chattahoochee	Mae Foley		
1990	Darkman	Julie Hastings		
1990	Miller's Crossing	Mayor's Secretary	Uncredited	
1990	Hidden Agenda	Ingrid Jessner		
1991	Barton Fink	Stage Actress	Voice only; Uncredited	
1991	The Butcher's Wife	Grace		
1992	Passed Away	Nora Scanlan		
1993	Short Cuts	Betty Weathers		
1994	Bleeding Hearts	Woman on TV		
1995	Beyond Rangoon	Andy Bowman		
1995	Palookaville	June		
1996	Fargo	Marge Gunderson		
1996	Primal Fear	Dr. Molly Arrington		
1996	Lone Star	Bunny		
1997	Paradise Road	Dr. Verstak		
1998	Johnny Skidmarks	Alice		
1998	Madeline	Miss Clavel		
1998	Talk of Angels	Conlon		
2000	Wonder Boys	Dean Sara Gaskell		
2000	Almost Famous	Elaine Miller		
2001	The Man Who Wasn't There	Doris Crane		
2002	Laurel Canyon	Jane		
2002	Searching for Debra Winger	Herself	Documentary	
2002	City by the Sea	Michelle		
2003	Something's Gotta Give	Zoe Barry		
2005	North Country	Glory		
2005	Æon Flux	The Handler		
2006	Friends with Money	Jane		
2008	Miss Pettigrew Lives for a Day	Guinevere Pettigrew		
2008	Burn After Reading	Linda Litzke		
2011	This Must Be the Place	Jane		
2011	Transformers: Dark of the Moon	Charlotte Mearing		
2012	Moonrise Kingdom	Mrs. Bishop		
2012	Madagascar 3: Europe's Most Wanted	Captain Chantel DuBois	Voice only	
2012	Promised Land	Sue Thomason		
2014	Every Secret Thing	Newscaster	Voice only; Uncredited; Also producer	
2015	The Good Dinosaur	Momma Ida	Voice only	
2016	Hail, Caesar!	C. C. Calhoun		
2017	Three Billboards Outside Ebbing, Missouri	Mildred Hayes		
2018	Isle of Dogs	Interpreter Nelson	Voice only	
2020	Nomadland	Fern	Also producer	
2021	The French Dispatch	Lucinda Krementz		
2021	The Tragedy of Macbeth	Lady Macbeth	Also producer	
2022	Women Talking	Scarface Janz	Also producer	
2024	Wolfs	Pamela Dowd-Henry	Voice only	
2027	Jack of Spades †	TBA	Post-production	

Key
†	Denotes films that have not yet been released

== Television ==
Year(s)	Title	Role(s)	Notes	Ref(s)
1985	Hunter	Nina Sloan	Episode: "The Garbage Man"	
1985	Hill Street Blues	Connie Chapman	6 episodes	
1986	Spenser: For Hire	Mary	Episode: "A Day's Wages"	
1986	The Twilight Zone	Amanda Strickland	Segment: "Need to Know"	
1986	Vengeance: The Story of Tony Cimo	Brigette	Television film	
1987	Leg Work	Willie Pipal	10 episodes	
1992	Crazy in Love	Clare	Television film	
1995	The Good Old Boys	Eve Calloway	Television film	
1996	Hidden in America	Gus	Television film	
1998	Sesame Street: Kids' Guide to Life: Big Bird Gets Lost	Herself	Short film	
2001	American Experience	Victoria Price	Voice only; Documentary; Episode: "Scottsboro: An American Tragedy"	
2001–2002	State of Grace	Narrator / Adult Hannah	Voice only; 39 episodes	
2006	The Simpsons	Melanie Upfoot	Voice only; Episode: "Girls Just Want to Have Sums"	
2014	Olive Kitteridge	Olive Kitteridge	4 episodes; also executive producer	
2019–2023	Good Omens	God	Voice only; 7 episodes	

== Theater ==
Year(s)	Title	Theater	Role	Notes	Ref(s)
1983–1984	Painting Churches	Lamb's Theatre	Margaret Church	Understudy; November 22, 1983 – May 20, 1984	
1984	Awake and Sing!	Circle in the Square Theatre	Hennie Berger	March 8 – April 29	
1988	A Streetcar Named Desire	Circle in the Square Theatre	Stella Kowalski	February 20 – April 17	
1992–1993	The Sisters Rosensweig	Mitzi E. Newhouse Theater	Pfeni Rosensweig	October 22, 1992 – February 28, 1993	
1993	The Swan	The Public Theater	Dora	November 9 – December 12	
2002–2003	Far Away	New York Theatre Workshop	Harper	November 11, 2002 – January 18, 2003	
2006	An Oak Tree	Barrow Street Theatre	Father	Each performance has a different guest actor playing Father	
2008	The Country Girl	Bernard B. Jacobs Theatre	Georgie Elgin	April 27 – July 20	
2011	Good People	Samuel J. Friedman Theatre	Margaret	February 8 – May 29	
2016	Macbeth	Berkeley Repertory Theatre	Lady Macbeth / Weird Sister	February 19 – April 10	

== See also ==
- List of awards and nominations received by Frances McDormand
