= List of awards and nominations received by Frances McDormand =

Frances McDormand awards and nominations
- McDormand at the 2015 Screen Actors Guild Awards
Awards and nominations
Award	Wins	Nominations
Academy Awards	4	8
BAFTA Awards	3	6
Critics' Choice Awards	7	12
Emmy Awards	2	3
Golden Globes	2	9
Actor Awards	4	9
Tony Awards	1	2

Totals (Note: Certain award groups do not simply award one winner. They acknowledge several different recipients, have runners-up, and have third place. Since this is a specific recognition and is different from losing an award, runner-up mentions are considered wins in this award tally. For simplification and to avoid errors, each award in this list has been presumed to have had a prior nomination.)
- Wins: 170
- Nominations: 350

Frances McDormand is an American actress and film producer who has received numerous accolades including four Academy Awards, two Emmy Awards, and a Tony Award, making her one of the few performers to achieve the "Triple Crown of Acting." Additionally, she has received three British Academy Film Awards, seven Critics' Choice Awards, two Golden Globe Awards, and four Actor Awards.

McDormand has received eight Academy Award nominations, winning Best Actress thrice for playing a pregnant police chief in the Coen Brothers black comedy crime film Fargo (1996), a woman bent on revenge in Martin McDonagh's crime drama Three Billboards Outside Ebbing, Missouri (2017), and a widow turned nomad in Chloe Zhao's drama Nomadland (2020). As one of the producers of Nomadland, she also won Best Picture. She was also Oscar-nominated for her performances as the wife of a small town sheriff in the crime thriller Mississippi Burning (1988), an overprotective mother in the comedy-drama Almost Famous (2000), and an iron mine worker in the social drama North Country (2005).

Her wins for Nomadland made her the first person in history to win Academy Awards both as producer and performer for the same film, the second woman in history to win Best Actress three times, and the seventh performer overall to win three competitive acting Academy Awards. McDormand was after Katharine Hepburn (who has four in total), Walter Brennan, Ingrid Bergman, Jack Nicholson, Meryl Streep, and Daniel Day-Lewis. McDormand has also received Academy Award nominations in five consecutive decades,

On television, McDormand won two Primetime Emmy Awards both for the HBO miniseries Olive Kitteridge (2014), for Outstanding Lead Actress in a Limited Series or Movie and Outstanding Limited or Anthology Series as one of the series producers. She was previously Emmy-nominated for her performance as a working class mechanic in the Showtime television film Hidden in America (1996). On stage, McDormand won the Tony Award for Best Actress in a Play playing a blue collar worker in Boston in the David Lindsay-Abaire play Good People (2011). She was previously Tony-nominated for playing Blanche DuBois in the revival of the Tennessee Williams play A Streetcar Named Desire (1988).

== Major industry awards ==
=== Academy Awards ===
Year	Category	Nominated work	Result	Ref.
1989	Best Supporting Actress	Mississippi Burning	Nominated	
1997	Best Actress	Fargo	Won	
2001	Best Supporting Actress	Almost Famous	Nominated	
2006	Best Supporting Actress	North Country	Nominated	
2018	Best Actress	Three Billboards Outside Ebbing, Missouri	Won	
2021	Best Actress	Nomadland	Won	
2021	Best Picture	Nomadland	Won	
2023	Best Picture	Women Talking	Nominated	

=== BAFTA Awards ===
Year	Category	Nominated work	Result	Ref.
British Academy Film Awards
1997	Best Actress in a Leading Role	Fargo	Nominated	
2001	Best Actress in a Supporting Role	Almost Famous	Nominated	
2006	Best Actress in a Supporting Role	North Country	Nominated	
2018	Best Actress in a Leading Role	Three Billboards Outside Ebbing, Missouri	Won	
2021	Best Actress in a Leading Role	Nomadland	Won	
2021	Best Film	Nomadland	Won	

=== Critics' Choice Awards ===
Year	Category	Nominated work	Result	Ref.
Critics' Choice Movie Awards
1996	Best Actress	Fargo	Won	
2000	Best Supporting Actress	Almost Famous / Wonder Boys	Won	
2005	Best Supporting Actress	North Country	Nominated	
2012	Best Acting Ensemble	Moonrise Kingdom	Nominated	
2017	Best Actress	Three Billboards Outside Ebbing, Missouri	Won	
2017	Best Acting Ensemble	Three Billboards Outside Ebbing, Missouri	Won	
2020	Best Picture	Nomadland	Won	
2020	Best Actress	Nomadland	Nominated	
2022	Best Picture	Women Talking	Nominated	
2022	Best Acting Ensemble	Women Talking	Nominated	
Critics' Choice Television Awards
2015	Best Movie/Miniseries	Olive Kitteridge	Won	
2015	Best Actress in a Movie/Miniseries	Olive Kitteridge	Won	

=== Emmy Awards ===
Year	Category	Nominated work	Result	Ref.
Primetime Emmy Awards
1997	Outstanding Supporting Actress in a Miniseries or a Special	Hidden in America	Nominated	
2015	Outstanding Limited Series	Olive Kitteridge	Won	
2015	Outstanding Lead Actress in a Limited Series or Movie	Olive Kitteridge	Won	

=== Golden Globe Awards ===
Year	Category	Nominated work	Result	Ref.
1994	Special Award for Ensemble (non-competitive)	Short Cuts	Recipient	
1997	Best Actress in a Motion Picture – Musical or Comedy	Fargo	Nominated	
2001	Best Supporting Actress – Motion Picture	Almost Famous	Nominated	
2006	Best Supporting Actress – Motion Picture	North Country	Nominated	
2009	Best Actress in a Motion Picture – Musical or Comedy	Burn After Reading	Nominated	
2015	Best Actress in a Miniseries or Motion Picture – Television	Olive Kitteridge	Nominated	
2015	Best Miniseries or TV Movie	Olive Kitteridge	Nominated	
2018	Best Actress in a Motion Picture – Drama	Three Billboards Outside Ebbing, Missouri	Won	
2021	Best Actress in a Motion Picture – Drama	Nomadland	Nominated	
2021	Best Motion Picture – Drama	Nomadland	Won	

=== Screen Actors Guild Awards ===
Year	Category	Nominated work	Result	Ref.
1997	Outstanding Actress in a Leading Role	Fargo	Won	
2001	Outstanding Actress in a Supporting Role	Almost Famous	Nominated	
2001	Outstanding Cast in a Motion Picture	Almost Famous	Nominated	
2006	Outstanding Actress in a Supporting Role	North Country	Nominated	
2015	Outstanding Actress in a Miniseries or Movie	Olive Kitteridge	Won	
2018	Outstanding Actress in a Leading Role	Three Billboards Outside Ebbing, Missouri	Won	
2018	Outstanding Cast in a Motion Picture	Three Billboards Outside Ebbing, Missouri	Won	
2021	Outstanding Actress in a Leading Role	Nomadland	Nominated	
2023	Outstanding Cast in a Motion Picture	Women Talking	Nominated	

=== Tony Awards ===
Year	Category	Nominated work	Result	Ref.
1988	Best Leading Actress in a Play	A Streetcar Named Desire	Nominated	
2011	Best Leading Actress in a Play	Good People	Won	

== Miscellaneous accolades ==
Organizations	Year	Category	Work	Result	Ref.
American Comedy Awards	1997	Funniest Actress in a Motion Picture (Leading Role)	Fargo	Won	
American Comedy Awards	2001	Funniest Actress in a Motion Picture (Supporting Role)	Almost Famous	Nominated	
AARP Movies for Grownups Awards	2009	Best Actress	Burn After Reading	Nominated	
AARP Movies for Grownups Awards	2013	Best Supporting Actress	Promised Land	Nominated	
AARP Movies for Grownups Awards	2018	Best Actress	Three Billboards Outside Ebbing, Missouri	Nominated	
AARP Movies for Grownups Awards	2021	Best Actress	Nomadland	Nominated	
AARP Movies for Grownups Awards	2021	Best Movie for Grownups	Nomadland	Nominated	
AARP Movies for Grownups Awards	2022	Best Actress	The Tragedy of Macbeth	Nominated	
AARP Movies for Grownups Awards	2023	Best Movie for Grownups	Women Talking	Nominated	
AARP Movies for Grownups Awards	2023	Best Ensemble	Women Talking	Nominated	
Australian Academy of Cinema and Television Arts Awards	2018	Best International Lead Actress – Cinema	Three Billboards Outside Ebbing, Missouri	Nominated	
Australian Academy of Cinema and Television Arts Awards	2020	Best International Lead Actress – Cinema	Nomadland	Nominated	
Alliance of Women Film Awards	2017	Actress Defying Age and Ageism	Three Billboards Outside Ebbing, Missouri	Nominated	
Alliance of Women Film Awards	2017	Bravest Performance	Three Billboards Outside Ebbing, Missouri	Nominated	
Alliance of Women Film Awards	2017	Best Actress	Three Billboards Outside Ebbing, Missouri	Won	
Alliance of Women Film Awards	2020	Best Actress	Nomadland	Won	
Alliance of Women Film Awards	2020	Actress Defying Age and Ageism	Nomadland	Nominated	
Awards Circuit Community Awards	1996	Best Actress in a Leading Role	Fargo	Won	
Awards Circuit Community Awards	1996	Best Cast Ensemble	Fargo	Won	
Awards Circuit Community Awards	2000	Best Actress in a Supporting Role	Almost Famous	Nominated	
Awards Circuit Community Awards	2008	Best Cast Ensemble	Burn After Reading	Nominated	
Awards Circuit Community Awards	2017	Best Cast Ensemble	Three Billboards Outside Ebbing, Missouri	Nominated	
Awards Circuit Community Awards	2017	Best Actress in a Leading Role	Three Billboards Outside Ebbing, Missouri	Won	
Behind The Voice Acting Feature Film Voice Acting Awards	2013	Best Female Vocal Performance in a Feature Film	Madagascar 3: Europe's Most Wanted	Nominated	
Behind The Voice Acting Feature Film Voice Acting Awards	2013	Best Vocal Ensemble in a Feature Film	Madagascar 3: Europe's Most Wanted	Nominated	
Black Reel Awards	2022	Outstanding Film	The Tragedy of Macbeth	Nominated	
Blockbuster Entertainment Awards	2001	Favorite Supporting Actress – Drama/Romance	Almost Famous	Nominated	
British Independent Film Awards	2017	Best Actress in a British Independent Film	Three Billboards Outside Ebbing, Missouri	Nominated	
British Independent Film Awards	2020	Best Foreign Independent Film	Nomadland	Won	
Capri Hollywood International Film Festival	2017	Best Actress	Three Billboards Outside Ebbing, Missouri	Won	
CinEuphoria Awards	2021	Best Actress - International Competition	Nomadland	Nominated	
Dorian Awards	2015	TV Performance of the Year – Actress	Olive Kitteridge	Nominated	
Dorian Awards	2017	Film Performance of the Year – Actress	Three Billboards Outside Ebbing, Missouri	Nominated	
Dorian Awards	2020	Film Performance of the Year – Actress	Nomadland	Nominated	
Dorian Awards	2020	Film of the Year	Nomadland	Won	
Drama Desk Awards	1988	Outstanding Featured Actress in a Play	A Streetcar Named Desire	Nominated	
Drama Desk Awards	2008	Outstanding Lead Actress in a Play	The Country Girl	Nominated	
Drama Desk Awards	2011	Outstanding Lead Actress in a Play	Good People	Won	
Elle Magazine Awards	2001	Women in Hollywood Icon Award	—N/a	Honored	
Empire Awards	1997	Best Actress	Fargo	Won	
Empire Awards	2018	Best Actress	Three Billboards Outside Ebbing, Missouri	Nominated	
Gijón International Film Festival	2003	Best Actress	Laurel Canyon	Won	
Gotham Awards	2012	Best Ensemble Cast	Moonrise Kingdom	Nominated	
Gotham Awards	2020	Best Actress	Nomadland	Nominated	
Gotham Awards	2020	Best Feature	Nomadland	Won	
Gotham Awards	2020	Audience Award	Nomadland	Won	
Independent Spirit Awards	1997	Best Female Lead	Fargo	Won	
Independent Spirit Awards	2004	Best Supporting Female	Laurel Canyon	Nominated	
Independent Spirit Awards	2007	Best Supporting Female	Friends with Money	Won	
Independent Spirit Awards	2018	Best Female Lead	Three Billboards Outside Ebbing, Missouri	Won	
Independent Spirit Awards	2020	Best Female Lead	Nomadland	Nominated	
Independent Spirit Awards	2020	Best Film	Nomadland	Won	
Independent Spirit Awards	2023	Best Film	Women Talking	Nominated	
Independent Spirit Awards	2023	Robert Altman Award	Women Talking	Won	
International Cinephile Society Awards	2021	Best Actress	Nomadland	Nominated	
Irish Film & Television Academy Awards	2018	Best International Actress	Three Billboards Outside Ebbing, Missouri	Won	
Lone Star Film & Television Awards	1996	Best Supporting Actress	Lone Star	Won	
National Board of Review Awards	1988	Best Supporting Actress	Mississippi Burning	Won	
National Board of Review Awards	1996	Best Actress	Fargo	Won	
National Board of Review Awards	2022	Best Cast	Women Talking	Won	
North Dakota Film Society Awards	2020	Best Actress	Nomadland	Won	
Online Film & Television Association Awards	1997	Best Lead Actress	Fargo	Won	
Online Film & Television Association Awards	2001	Best Supporting Actress	Almost Famous	Nominated	
Online Film & Television Association Awards	2020	Best Lead Actress	Nomadland	Nominated	
Online Film & Television Association Awards	2020	Best Picture	Nomadland	Nominated	
Producers Guild of America Awards	2020	Best Theatrical Motion Picture	Nomadland	Won	
Satellite Awards	1997	Best Actress in a Motion Picture – Drama	Fargo	Won	
Satellite Awards	2001	Best Supporting Actress in a Motion Picture	Almost Famous	Nominated	
Satellite Awards	2005	Best Supporting Actress in a Motion Picture	North Country	Nominated	
Satellite Awards	2015	Best Actress in a Miniseries or TV Movie	Olive Kitteridge	Won	
Satellite Awards	2015	Best Miniseries or TV Movie	Olive Kitteridge	Won	
Satellite Awards	2018	Best Actress in a Motion Picture – Drama	Three Billboards Outside Ebbing, Missouri	Nominated	
Satellite Awards	2020	Best Actress in a Motion Picture – Drama	Nomadland	Won	
Satellite Awards	2020	Best Motion Picture – Drama	Nomadland	Won	
Satellite Awards	2023	Best Motion Picture – Drama	Woman Talking	Nominated	
Saturn Awards	1997	Best Film Actress	Fargo	Nominated	
Saturn Awards	2002	Best Film Supporting Actress	The Man Who Wasn't There	Nominated	
Saturn Awards	2018	Best Film Actress	Three Billboards Outside Ebbing, Missouri	Nominated	
Venice Film Festival	1993	Special Volpi Cup for Best Ensemble Cast Performance	Short Cuts	Honored	
Venice Film Festival	2014	Visionary Award	—N/a	Honored	

== Critics associations ==
Organizations	Year	Category	Work	Result	Ref.
African-American Film Critics Association	2017	Best Actress	Three Billboards Outside Ebbing, Missouri	Won	
African-American Film Critics Association	2021	Best Picture	The Tragedy of Macbeth	Nominated	
Atlanta Film Critics Circle Awards	2018	Best Ensemble Performance	Three Billboards Outside Ebbing, Missouri	Won	
Atlanta Film Critics Circle Awards	2020	Best Actress	Nomadland	2nd place	
Atlanta Film Critics Circle Awards	2020	Best Picture	Nomadland	Won	
Atlanta Film Critics Circle Awards	2022	Best Picture	Women Talking	8th place	
Austin Film Critics Association	2017	Best Actress	Three Billboards Outside Ebbing, Missouri	Won	
Austin Film Critics Association	2020	Best Actress	Nomadland	Nominated	
Austin Film Critics Association	2020	Best Picture	Nomadland	Nominated	
Austin Film Critics Association	2021	Best Ensemble	The French Dispatch	Won	
Austin Film Critics Association	2023	Best Ensemble	Woman Talking	Nominated	
Black Film Critics Circle Awards	2017	Best Actress	Three Billboards Outside Ebbing, Missouri	Won	
Black Film Critics Circle Awards	2021	Best Picture	Nomadland	3rd place	
Boston Society of Film Critics	2000	Best Supporting Actress	Almost Famous	Won	
Boston Society of Film Critics	2000	Best Supporting Actress	Wonder Boys	Won	
Boston Society of Film Critics	2012	Best Cast	Moonrise Kingdom	2nd place	
Boston Society of Film Critics	2020	Best Film	Nomadland	Won	
Boston Society of Film Critics	2022	Best Cast	Women Talking	Won	
Boston Online Film Critics Association	2020	Best Actress	Nomadland	Won	
Boston Online Film Critics Association	2020	Best Picture	Nomadland	Won	
Central Ohio Film Critics Association	2013	Best Ensemble	Moonrise Kingdom	Won	
Chicago Film Critics Association	1988	Best Supporting Actress	Mississippi Burning	Won	
Chicago Film Critics Association	1996	Best Actress	Fargo	Won	
Chicago Film Critics Association	2000	Best Supporting Actress	Almost Famous	Won	
Chicago Film Critics Association	2017	Best Actress	Three Billboards Outside Ebbing Missouri	Nominated	
Chicago Film Critics Association	2020	Best Actress	Nomadland	Won	
Chicago Film Critics Association	2020	Best Film	Nomadland	Won	
Chicago Indie Critics Awards	2020	Best Actress	Nomadland	Nominated	
Chicago Indie Critics Awards	2020	Best Independent Film	Nomadland	Won	
Chicago Indie Critics Awards	2023	Best Ensemble	Women Talking	Nominated	
Chicago Indie Critics Awards	2023	Best Independent Film	Women Talking	Nominated	
Columbus Film Critics Association	2021	Best Actress	Nomadland	Nominated	
Columbus Film Critics Association	2021	Best Picture	Nomadland	Nominated	
Columbus Film Critics Association	2023	Best Ensemble	Women Talking	Nominated	
Columbus Film Critics Association	2023	Best Picture	Women Talking	Nominated	
Dallas-Fort Worth Film Critics Association	1996	Best Actress	Fargo	Won	
Dallas-Fort Worth Film Critics Association	2001	Best Supporting Actress	Almost Famous	Nominated	
Dallas-Fort Worth Film Critics Association	2017	Best Actress	Three Billboards Outside Ebbing, Missouri	2nd place	
Dallas-Fort Worth Film Critics Association	2020	Best Actress	Nomadland	Nominated	
Dallas-Fort Worth Film Critics Association	2020	Best Picture	Nomadland	Won	
Dallas-Fort Worth Film Critics Association	2022	Best Picture	Woman Talking	6nd place	
Denver Film Critics Society	2021	Best Actress	Nomadland	Nominated	
Denver Film Critics Society	2021	Best Picture	Nomadland	Nominated	
Denver Film Critics Society	2023	Best Ensemble	Women Talking	Nominated	
Detroit Film Critics Society	2017	Best Actress	Three Billboards Outside Ebbing, Missouri	Won	
Detroit Film Critics Society	2020	Best Actress	Nomadland	Won	
Detroit Film Critics Society	2020	Best Film	Nomadland	Won	
DiscussingFilm Critics Awards	2021	Best Film Actress	Nomadland	Nominated	
DiscussingFilm Critics Awards	2021	Best Picture	Nomadland	Nominated	
DiscussingFilm Critics Awards	2023	Best Ensemble	Woman Talking	Won	
DiscussingFilm Critics Awards	2023	Best Picture	Woman Talking	Nominated	
Dublin Film Critics' Circle	2021	Best Actress	The Tragedy of Macbeth / Nomadland	Won	
Dublin Film Critics' Circle	2021	Best Picture	Nomadland	Nominated	
Florida Film Critics Circle	1997	Best Actress	Fargo	Won	
Florida Film Critics Circle	2000	Best Supporting Actress	Almost Famous	Won	
Florida Film Critics Circle	2000	Best Supporting Actress	Wonder Boys	Won	
Florida Film Critics Circle	2020	Best Actress	Nomadland	Won	
Florida Film Critics Circle	2020	Best Picture	Nomadland	Nominated	
Georgia Film Critics Association Awards	2020	Best Actress	Nomadland	Nominated	
Georgia Film Critics Association Awards	2020	Best Picture	Nomadland	Won	
Georgia Film Critics Association Awards	2023	Best Ensemble	Woman Talking	Nominated	
Hollywood Critics Association	2021	Best Picture	Nomadland	Nominated	
Hollywood Critics Association	2021	Best Actress	Nomadland	Nominated	
Hollywood Critics Association	2023	Best Picture	Woman Talking	Nominated	
Hollywood Critics Association	2023	Best Ensemble	Woman Talking	Nominated	
Houston Film Critics Society	2017	Best Actress	Three Billboards Outside Ebbing, Missouri	Nominated	
Houston Film Critics Society	2020	Best Actress	Nomadland	Nominated	
Houston Film Critics Society	2020	Best Picture	Nomadland	Won	
Houston Film Critics Society	2021	Best Picture	The Tragedy of Macbeth	Nominated	
Houston Film Critics Society	2023	Best Picture	Woman Talking	Nominated	
Houston Film Critics Society	2023	Best Ensemble	Woman Talking	Won	
Kansas City Film Critics Society	1988	Best Supporting Actress	Mississippi Burning	Won	
Kansas City Film Critics Society	1997	Best Actress	Fargo	Won	
Kansas City Film Critics Society	2020	Best Actress	Nomadland	2nd place	
Las Vegas Film Critics Society Awards	2000	Best Supporting Actress	Almost Famous	Nominated	
Las Vegas Film Critics Society Awards	2000	Best Supporting Actress	Wonder Boys	Nominated	
Las Vegas Film Critics Society Awards	2005	Best Supporting Actress	North Country	Won	
Las Vegas Film Critics Society Awards	2017	Best Actress	Three Billboards Outside Ebbing, Missouri	Won	
Las Vegas Film Critics Society Awards	2020	Best Actress	Nomadland	Won	
Las Vegas Film Critics Society Awards	2020	Best Picture	Nomadland	Won	
Las Vegas Film Critics Society Awards	2023	Best Ensemble	Women Talking	Nominated	
London Film Critics' Circle Awards	1997	Actress of the Year	Fargo	Won	
London Film Critics' Circle Awards	2018	Actress of the Year	Three Billboards Outside Ebbing, Missouri	Won	
London Film Critics' Circle Awards	2020	Actress of the Year	Nomadland	Won	
London Film Critics' Circle Awards	2020	Film of the Year	Nomadland	Won	
Los Angeles Film Critics Association	1996	Best Actress	Fargo	2nd place	
Los Angeles Film Critics Association	2000	Best Supporting Actress	Almost Famous	Won	
Los Angeles Film Critics Association	2000	Best Supporting Actress	Wonder Boys	Won	
Los Angeles Film Critics Association	2017	Best Actress	Three Billboards Outside Ebbing, Missouri	2nd place	
National Society of Film Critics	1997	Best Actress	Fargo	3rd place	
National Society of Film Critics	2001	Best Supporting Actress	Almost Famous	2nd place	
National Society of Film Critics	2001	Best Supporting Actress	Wonder Boys	2nd place	
National Society of Film Critics	2018	Best Actress	Three Billboards Outside Ebbing, Missouri	3rd place	
National Society of Film Critics	2020	Best Actress	Nomadland	Won	
National Society of Film Critics	2020	Best Film	Nomadland	Won	
New York Film Critics Circle	1996	Best Actress	Fargo	2nd place	
New York Film Critics Circle	2000	Best Supporting Actress	Almost Famous	2nd place	
North Carolina Film Critics Association	2020	Best Actress	Nomadland	Won	
North Carolina Film Critics Association	2020	Best Picture	Nomadland	Nominated	
North Carolina Film Critics Association	2023	Best Picture	Women Talking	Nominated	
North Carolina Film Critics Association	2023	Best Ensemble	Women Talking	Nominated	
North Texas Film Critics Association	2017	Best Actress	Three Billboards Outside Ebbing, Missouri	Won	
North Texas Film Critics Association	2020	Best Actress	Nomadland	Nominated	
North Texas Film Critics Association	2020	Best Picture	Nomadland	Nominated	
Online Film Critics Society	2001	Best Ensemble Cast Performance	Almost Famous	Won	
Online Film Critics Society	2001	Best Supporting Actress	Almost Famous	Nominated	
Online Film Critics Society	2020	Best Picture	Nomadland	Won	
Online Film Critics Society	2020	Best Actress	Nomadland	Won	
Online Film Critics Society	2023	Best Picture	Women Talking	Nominated	
Outer Critics Circle Awards	2011	Outstanding Leading Actress in a Play	Good People	Won	
Phoenix Film Critics Society Awards	2001	Best Actress in a Supporting Role	Almost Famous	Nominated	
Phoenix Film Critics Society Awards	2001	Best Actress in a Supporting Role	Wonder Boys	Nominated	
Phoenix Film Critics Society Awards	2012	Best Ensemble	Moonrise Kingdom	Nominated	
Phoenix Film Critics Society Awards	2018	Best Actress in a Leading Role	Three Billboards Outside Ebbing, Missouri	Won	
Phoenix Film Critics Society Awards	2020	Best Actress	Nomadland	Nominated	
Phoenix Film Critics Society Awards	2020	Best Picture	Nomadland	Won	
Phoenix Film Critics Society Awards	2022	Best Picture	Women Talking	Nominated	
San Diego Film Critics Society	1996	Best Leading Actress	Fargo	Won	
San Diego Film Critics Society	2000	Best Supporting Actress	Almost Famous	Won	
San Diego Film Critics Society	2020	Best Leading Actress	Nomadland	2nd place	
San Diego Film Critics Society	2020	Best Picture	Nomadland	Nominated	
San Diego Film Critics Society	2023	Best Ensemble	Women Talking	Runner-up	
San Francisco Film Critics Circle	2020	Best Actress	Nomadland	Won	
San Francisco Film Critics Circle	2020	Best Picture	Nomadland	Won	
San Francisco Film Critics Circle	2023	Best Picture	Women Talking	Nominated	
Seattle Film Critics Society Awards	2017	Best Actress	Three Billboards Outside Ebbing, Missouri	Nominated	
Seattle Film Critics Society Awards	2020	Best Actress	Nomadland	Won	
Seattle Film Critics Society Awards	2020	Best Picture	Nomadland	Won	
Seattle Film Critics Society Awards	2023	Best Ensemble	Women Talking	Nominated	
Society of Texas Film Critics	1996	Best Actress	Fargo	Won	
Southeastern Film Critics Association	1997	Best Actress	Fargo	Won	
Southeastern Film Critics Association	2001	Best Supporting Actress	Almost Famous	Won	
Southeastern Film Critics Association	2012	Best Cast	Moonrise Kingdom	2nd place	
Southeastern Film Critics Association	2020	Best Actress	Nomadland	Won	
Southeastern Film Critics Association	2020	Best Picture	Nomadland	Won	
Southeastern Film Critics Association	2022	Best Ensemble	Women Talking	Nominated	
Southeastern Film Critics Association	2022	Best Picture	Women Talking	Nominated	
St. Louis Film Critics Association	2006	Best Supporting Actress	North Country	Nominated	
St. Louis Film Critics Association	2009	Best Supporting Actress	Burn After Reading	Nominated	
St. Louis Film Critics Association	2018	Best Actress	Three Billboards Outside Ebbing, Missouri	Won	
St. Louis Film Critics Association	2020	Best Actress	Nomadland	2nd place	
St. Louis Film Critics Association	2020	Best Film	Nomadland	Won	
St. Louis Film Critics Association	2021	Best Film	The Tragedy of Macbeth	Nominated	
St. Louis Film Critics Association	2021	The French Dispatch	Best Ensemble	Nominated	
St. Louis Film Critics Association	2022	Best Film	Women Talking	Nominated	
St. Louis Film Critics Association	2022	Best Ensemble	Women Talking	Won	
Toronto Film Critics Association	2017	Best Actress	Three Billboards Outside Ebbing, Missouri	Won	
Toronto Film Critics Association	2021	Best Actress	Nomadland	Won	
Toronto Film Critics Association	2021	Best Picture	Nomadland	Won	
Toronto Film Critics Association	2023	Best Picture	Women Talking	Runner-up	
Utah Film Critics Association Awards	2008	Best Supporting Performance, Female	Burn After Reading	2nd place	
Utah Film Critics Association Awards	2017	Best Lead Performance, Female	Three Billboards Outside Ebbing, Missouri	2nd place	
Utah Film Critics Association Awards	2020	Best Lead Performance, Female	Nomadland	Won	
Vancouver Film Critics Circle	2017	Best Actress	Three Billboards Outside Ebbing, Missouri	Nominated	
Vancouver Film Critics Circle	2020	Best Actress	Nomadland	Won	
Vancouver Film Critics Circle	2020	Best Film	Nomadland	Won	
Washington D.C. Area Film Critics Association Awards	2018	Best Actress	Three Billboards Outside Ebbing, Missouri	Won	
Washington D.C. Area Film Critics Association Awards	2018	Best Ensemble	Three Billboards Outside Ebbing, Missouri	Won	
Washington D.C. Area Film Critics Association Awards	2020	Best Actress	Nomadland	Won	
Washington D.C. Area Film Critics Association Awards	2020	Best Picture	Nomadland	Won	
Women Film Critics Circle Awards	2005	Best Female Images in a Movie	North Country	Won	
Women Film Critics Circle Awards	2012	Best Screen Couple	Moonrise Kingdom	Won	
Women Film Critics Circle Awards	2017	Best Actress	Three Billboards Outside Ebbing, Missouri	Won	

== See also ==
- Frances McDormand on screen and stage
- Triple Crown of Acting
