= Sandra Bundy =

American activist (born 1934)

- Born: March 12, 1934 (age 92)
- Known for: Landmark case Bundy v. Jackson

Sandra Bundy (born March 12, 1934) is best known for her part in landmark case Bundy v. Jackson, which was the first federal appeals court case to hold that workplace sexual harassment was employment discrimination and a violation of the Civil Rights Act of 1964.

== Biography ==
Sandra Bundy grew up in Washington, D.C. Her father left the family when she was still a child. She has said she believes a lack of a father figure may have contributed to her problems with relationships later in life. She graduated in 1952 from Armstrong Technical, a D.C. public high school that is now closed. Bundy studied for two years at the (now) University of the District of Columbia, but did not complete her degree.

Bundy was married five times. Two of her husbands beat her, giving her concussions. She had five children, though one daughter died as a toddler after a neighborhood boy lit the 3-year-old's dress on fire with matches. None of her children's fathers stayed in Bundy's life or paid child support.

Bundy participated in the civil rights movement in the 1960s, including attending marches. She also started a union supporting an end to racial segregation in the workforce.

In the late 1960s, Bundy worked as a U.S. Department of Commerce clerk during the day, and as a grocery store cashier at night, but was still having major financial problems and filed for bankruptcy. Her boss at the U.S. Department of Commerce said she couldn't receive any more promotions because she lacked a college degree and she decided to find a new job.

=== Harassment at Department of Corrections ===
Bundy, then a single mother of four children, joined the city government believing it offered opportunities for advancement and was hired by the District of Columbia Department of Corrections (DCDC) in 1970. She earned a yearly salary of $10,500, which was more than twice the starting salary of her old job, and was able to quit her second job as a night cashier. She was promoted several times and became a vocational rehabilitation specialist and helped former inmates find jobs.

Bundy alleges that four supervisors sexually harassed her between 1972 and 1975, including Arthur Burton, James Gainey, Lawrence Swain and Delbert Jackson.

Her supervisor Arthur Burton began making sexual comments about her in 1974, and asked her several times to leave work and go home with him, though Bundy said no every time. One time Burton called Bundy's home in the evening, though her number was unlisted, and then hung up on her when she refused to meet with him.

After a time, Bundy's former colleague James Gainey became her new supervisor. He began doing things in the office that made her uncomfortable, like patting her buttocks and calling her "fine Momma." He once invited her on a vacation, which she refused. He often asked her to sleep with him, and once said, "I've got a pocketful of money. Let's take the afternoon off to a motel and lay up." She said no to each of his advances.

Bundy's supervisors regularly criticized her for taking too much time off and poor work performance, though she had never received such criticisms before rejecting their advances. At one point, Gainey threatened to fire her. Bundy later learned she'd been overlooked for a promotion while her male colleagues had moved up or been recommended. When she complained to her supervisors' superior Lawrence Swain, he told her that "any man in his right mind would want to rape you." The next time she complained to him, he ignored her complaints and asked if she was dating anyone, adding, "Because if not, I want to take you to bed myself." On the advice of a female colleague, she began keeping a diary and recording each incident.

Bundy began having trouble sleeping, and lost weight. She often cried and once contemplated suicide. She started seeing a psychiatrist, and was prescribed medication for anxiety and depression.

Years earlier, a colleague named Delbert Jackson had made several unsuccessful passes at Bundy and tried to get her to drink with him (she didn't drink), but when he was promoted to director of the DCDC she got desperate and went to him for help in April 1975. However, he and other boardmembers refused to concede she had a case.

Bundy sought help from the Equal Employment Opportunity officers at the DCDC, but they cautioned her against bringing unwarranted complaints. Bundy's black co-workers criticized her for bringing forth the suit. However, Bundy filed an informal and then a formal complaint.

=== Bundy v. Jackson case ===
When no action was taken, Bundy met with lawyer Robert Adler, who agreed to take on the case even though there was no legal precedent and Bundy didn't have much money to offer. Bundy filed suit in 1977 in the United States District Court for the District of Columbia seeking declaratory and injunctive relief. Bundy v. Jackson was heavily covered by the press and although it initially lost in court, after being appealed it became the first federal appeals court case to hold that workplace sexual harassment was employment discrimination and a violation of the Civil Rights Act of 1964. Five years later the Supreme Court agreed with this holding in Meritor Savings Bank v. Vinson.

== Film ==
A feature film about her life called Silence Breaker: The Sandra Bundy Story, was announced by Adaptive Studios and EnLight Productions in March 2018. The film has yet to be made.

== Personal ==
Bundy lives near Washington, DC. She has a piano and enjoys gardening, which she has said is "therapy for me."
