= Bundy v. Jackson =

D.C. Circuit opinion

- Court: United States Court of Appeals for the District of Columbia Circuit
- Full case name: Sandra G. BUNDY, Appellant, v. Delbert JACKSON, Director, D.C. Department of Corrections, Appellee
- Argued: March 26 1980
- Decided: January 12 1981
- Citations: 641 F.2d 934; 205 U.S. App. D.C. 444; 24 Fair Empl. Prac. Cas. (BNA) 1155; 24 Empl. Prac. Dec. (CCH) ¶ 31,439

Holding
- Workplace sexual harassment could constitute employment discrimination under the Civil Rights Act of 1964.

Court membership
- Judges sitting: Chief Judge J. Skelly Wright Circuit Judges Luther Merritt Swygert and Spottswood William Robinson III

Case opinions
- Majority: J. Skelly Wright

Bundy v. Jackson, 641 F.2d 934 (D.C. Cir. 1981), was a D.C. Circuit opinion, written by Judge Skelly Wright, that held that workplace sexual harassment could constitute employment discrimination under the Civil Rights Act of 1964.

== Facts ==
Sandra Bundy was hired at the District of Columbia Department of Corrections (DCDC) in 1970 and was promoted several times, becoming a vocational rehabilitation specialist who helped find jobs for ex-offenders. From 1972 onward she was sexually harassed by a number of fellow employees and supervisors, including Delbert Jackson, who later became the director of the DCDC. Bundy's supervisors regularly questioned her about her sexual proclivities and invited her back to their apartments or to motels. When she complained to her supervisors' superior, he told her that "any man in his right mind would want to rape you" and then propositioned her himself. Afterwards, Bundy's supervisors began to criticize her for taking too much time off and poor work performance, though she had never received such criticisms before her attempt to complain. Bundy sought help from the Equal Employment Opportunity officers at the DCDC, but they only cautioned her against bringing unwarranted complaints. However, Bundy filed an informal and then a formal complaint. When no action was taken, Bundy filed suit in 1977 in the United States District Court for the District of Columbia seeking declaratory and injunctive relief.

== Judgment ==
The District Court found that sexual harassment was standard operating procedure at the DCDC, but held that Bundy's rights under Title VII of the Civil Rights Act of 1964 had not been violated. Title VII prohibits discrimination (on the basis of sex or certain other characteristics) with respect to "compensation, terms, conditions, or privileges of employment." The District Court held that, despite Bundy's allegations, her promotions had not been delayed or denied due to her rejections of her supervisors' unwanted sexual advances.

On appeal, Judge Wright's opinion for the court agreed with Bundy that "'conditions of employment' include the psychological and emotional work environment." Wright relied on analogies to racial discrimination cases such as Rogers v. Equal Employment Opportunity Commission, a Fifth Circuit case in which a Hispanic employee sued her employer, a firm of opticians, for creating a discriminatory and offensive work environment by giving discriminatory service to its Hispanic clients. Wright agreed with that case's conclusion that Title VII should be construed broadly to extend beyond discrimination in hiring, firing, and promoting; sexual harassment, like racial harassment, can poison the atmosphere of employment and thereby violate Title VII. If this were not the case, Wright pointed out, "an employer could sexually harass a female employee with impunity by carefully stopping short of firing the employee or taking any other tangible actions against her in response to her resistance."

The case was remanded to the District Court with instructions to order the director of the DCDC "to ensure that complaints of sexual harassment receive thorough and effective treatment within the formal process the agency has already established." On Bundy's claims for back pay and a promotion she had been denied, Wright's opinion held that the District Court had failed to properly allocate the burden of proof. Wright established a formula as follows:

To establish a prima facie case of illegal denial of promotion in retaliation against the plaintiff's refusal of sexual advances by her supervisors, the plaintiff must show (1) that she was a victim of a pattern or practice of sexual harassment attributable to her employer (Bundy has, of course, already shown this); and (2) that she applied for and was denied a promotion for which she was technically eligible and of which she had a reasonable expectation. If the prima facie case is made out, the employer then must bear the burden of showing, by clear and convincing evidence, that he had legitimate nondiscriminatory reasons for denying the claimant the promotion.

== Significance ==
With Bundy v. Jackson, the D.C. Circuit became the first federal appeals court to hold that workplace sexual harassment was employment discrimination and a violation of the Civil Rights Act of 1964. Five years later the Supreme Court agreed with this holding in Meritor Savings Bank v. Vinson.

Bundy v. Jackson allowed for an expansion of Title VII rights. Previously, the same appeals court had set a more limited precedent concerning sexual harassment in Barnes v. Costle (1977). The court found that sexual harassment which led to the loss of tangible employment benefits, like a lost job or skipped promotions, was discrimination by sex and in violation of Title VII. In Barnes v. Costle, discrimination was linked to the lost benefits, and not to the sexual harassment in itself, so it was still an open question of whether sexual harassment itself could constitute a violation of Title VII. Bundy v. Jackson established that sexual harassment could be viewed this way under the law.
