= Judge McNulty =

Judge McNulty may refer to:

- Kevin McNulty (judge) (born 1954), judge of the United States District Court for the District of New Jersey
- Patrick J. McNulty (1922–1997), judge of the United States Bankruptcy Court for the District of Minnesota and magistrate judge of the United States District Court for the District of Minnesota
