= Jenson v. Eveleth Taconite Co. =

U.S. class-action sexual harassment lawsuit

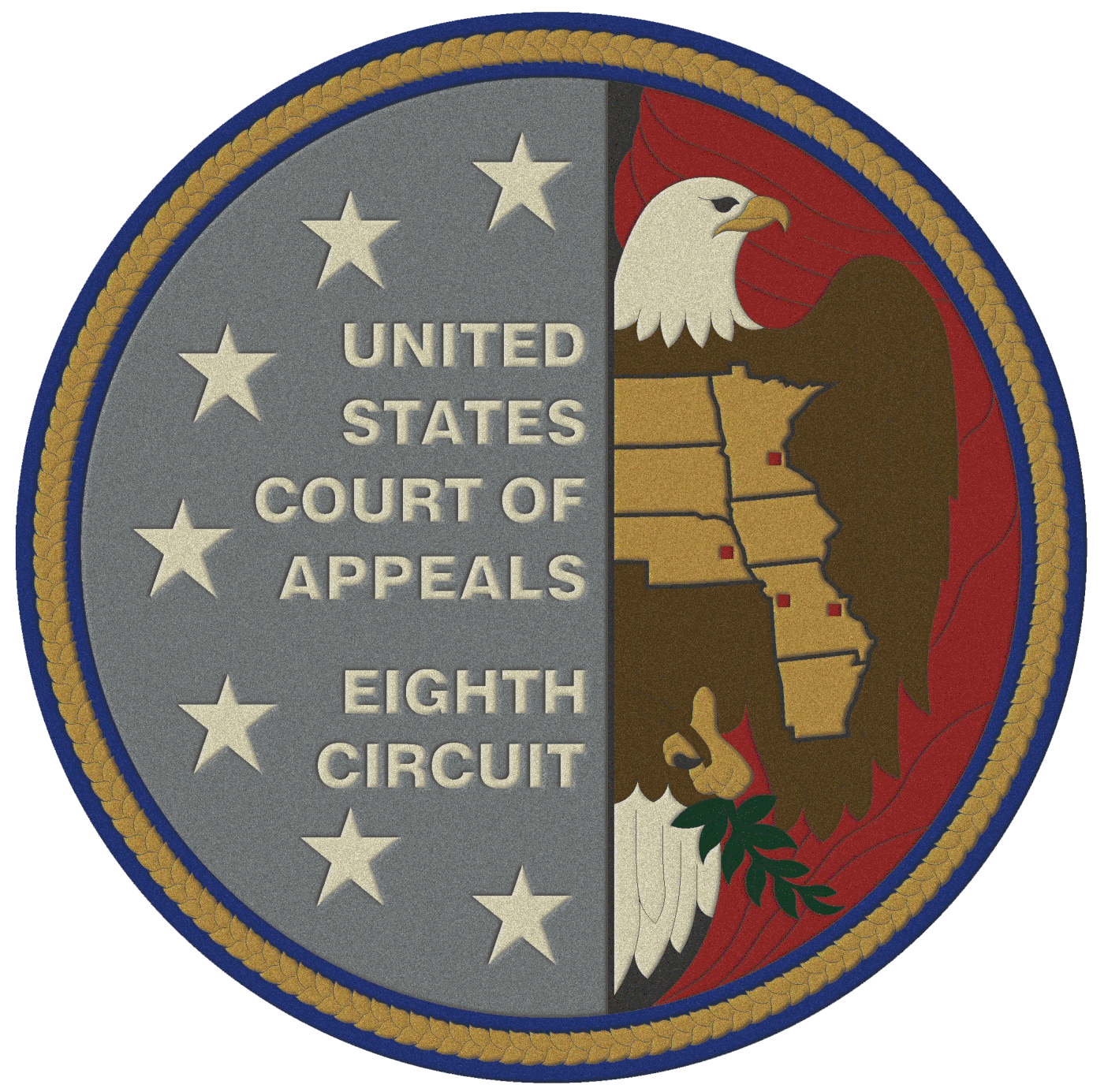
- Court: United States Court of Appeals for the Eighth Circuit
- Full case name: Lois E. Jenson v. Eveleth Taconite Company, et al.
- Submitted: October 21, 1997
- Decided: December 5, 1997
- Citations: 130 F.3d 1287; 75 Fair Empl. Prac. Cas. (BNA) 852,72 Empl. Prac. Dec. (CCH) ¶ 45,174; 48 Fed. R. Evid. Ser v. 454

Case history
- Prior history: 139 F.R.D. 657 (D. Minn. 1991); 824 F. Supp. 847 (D. Minn. 1993)
- Subsequent history: Rehearing en banc denied, February 18, 1998

Court membership
- Judges sitting: Theodore McMillian, Floyd Robert Gibson, Donald P. Lay

Case opinions
- Majority: Lay, joined by a unanimous panel

Jenson v. Eveleth Taconite Co., 130 F.3d 1287 (8th Cir. 1997), was the first class-action sexual harassment lawsuit in the United States. It was filed in 1988 on behalf of Lois Jenson and other female workers at the Eveleth Taconite mine in Eveleth, Minnesota on the state's northern Mesabi Range, which is part of the Iron Range.

== Facts ==
Jenson first began working at the site in March 1975 and, along with other women, endured a continuous stream of hostile behavior from male employees, including sexual harassment, abusive language, threats, stalking and intimidation. Specifically, hostile behavior several women faced included repulsive sexual graffiti and men masturbating on women or in front of women. In one case, a man purposely kicked over a porta potty that was occupied by a female employee. In another case, a woman named Judy Jarvela who also worked at the mine reported multiple instances where she came back to her locker with semen on her clothing. One of her co-workers, Diane Hodge, reported that other male co-workers would come up from behind Jarvela and grab her breasts in front of the other co-workers.

Their union, USW, did nothing to stop it. They worked with Eveleth's management to create a divide between the female workers in a successful attempt to get them to testify in opposition of these accusations against Eveleth. On October 5, 1984, Jenson mailed a complaint to the Minnesota Department of Human Rights outlining the problems she experienced. In retaliation, her car tires were slashed a week later. In January 1987, the state's agency requested that Ogelbay Norton Co., a Cleveland, Ohio-based part-owner of the mine, pay US$6,000 in punitive damages and $5,000 to Jenson for mental anguish, but the company refused.

On August 15, 1988, attorney Paul Sprenger filed Lois E. Jenson and Patricia S. Kosmach v. Eveleth Taconite Co. in the U.S. District Court in Minneapolis. Sprenger's complaint stated that Eveleth Mines was discriminatory against female employees and created as well as condoned a hostile work environment for female workers. Patricia S. Kosmach was another named plaintiff for the case, and Kathy Anderson was the third named plaintiff for the Jenson v. Eveleth case. Class-action status was requested at the time, and granted by James M. Rosenbaum on December 16, 1991. Jenson quit working at the mine on January 25, 1992, and was diagnosed with post-traumatic stress disorder a short time later.

A liability trial began on December 17, 1992, in front of Judge Richard Kyle in St. Paul, Minnesota, and six months later, he ruled that the company should have prevented the misconduct. The company was ordered to educate all employees about sexual harassment.

Patrick J. McNulty of Duluth was named special master a few months later to oversee a trial that would determine the amount of money owed to the women in damages. The retired federal magistrate permitted lawyers from the mine company to obtain medical records of all of the women for their entire lifetimes. Ahead of the trial, the plaintiffs endured long depositions that explored their personal lives in great detail.

The first half of the trial for damages began in Duluth on January 17, 1995 and lasted until February 10. After a break, it resumed on May 22 and ended on June 13.

On March 28, 1996, McNulty released a 416-page report that called the women "histrionic," made public details about their private lives, and awarded them an average of $10,000 each. However, the judgment was appealed and reversed by the Eighth Circuit Court of Appeals on December 5, 1997. A new jury trial on damages was ordered.

== Settlement ==
On December 23, 1998, just before the trial was set to begin, fifteen women settled with Eveleth Mines for a total of $3.5 million. One of the original plaintiffs, Pat Kosmach, died partway through the case, on November 7, 1994.

The case was documented in the 2002 book Class Action and a 2005 fictionalized film version, North Country.

== See also ==
- Hostile Advances: The Kerry Ellison Story movie about Ellison v. Brady which set the "reasonable woman" precedent in sexual harassment law
- Hostile work environment
- List of class action lawsuits
- Meritor Savings Bank v. Vinson
- Oncale v. Sundowner Offshore Services
- Oglebay Norton Corporation

== Notes ==
- U.S. 8th Circuit Court of Appeals case documents
- Class Action: The Story of Lois Jenson and the Landmark Case That Changed Sexual Harassment Law (2003) ISBN 0-385-49613-3
- North Country at IMDb
