= Barnes v. Train =

1974 sexual harassment case in the US

Barnes v. Train (1974) is commonly viewed as the first sexual harassment case in America, even though the term "sexual harassment" was not used. The case involved Paulette Barnes, a payroll clerk who worked for the Environmental Protection Agency. Barnes brought the case after losing her job for refusing the advances of a male supervisor. The case was initially dismissed, but won on appeal in Barnes v. Costle (1977). The case helped set a precedent that sexual harassment leading to the loss of tangible job benefit is illegal because it involves discrimination based on gender.

== Judgment ==
Barnes initially filed the case in the District Court for the District of Columbia. The court decided that the sexual harassment Barnes faced caused her to lose her job, but that this was not illegal because it was not solely due to gender: she was fired "not because she was a woman, but because she refused to engage in a sexual affair with her supervisor." Therefore, the court reasoned, Barnes had not faced gender discrimination in violation of Title VII of the Civil Rights Act of 1964. This court gave a summary judgement for her employer and denied her claim.

During Barnes v. Costle, the United States Court of Appeals for the District of Columbia Circuit reversed the original findings. The appeals court ruled it was sex discrimination for a woman to suffer tangible employment losses (for example losing her job) for refusing to submit to requests for sexual favors. The ruling was based in part on the Williams v. Saxbe (1976) decision by a U.S. District Court which ruled that quid pro quo sexual harassment constitutes sex discrimination under the Civil Rights Act of 1964. In Barnes, the appeals court found that the supervisor's quid pro quo harassment was not applied to male employees. Thus Barnes' supervisor discriminated by gender, which was just as key to his punishment of Barnes as her lack of cooperation, making his actions illegal.

The appeals court in Barnes also found that companies are liable for not stopping sexual harassment if they know it is being conducted by supervisors. As a result of Barnes v. Costle, Barnes received about $18,000 for back pay and the loss of promotions.

== Significance ==
Barnes helped set the precedent that sexual harassment leading to tangible employment loss was sex discrimination covered by Title VII, but it wasn't until Bundy v. Jackson (1981) that workplace sexual harassment, even without tangible employment loss, could constitute illegal discrimination by sex.
