= Hostile work environment =

United States legal concept concerning employment

In United States labor law, a hostile work environment exists when one's behavior within a workplace creates an environment that is difficult or uncomfortable for another person to work in, due to illegal discrimination. However, a working environment that is unpleasant and frightening for the victim due to sexual advances that have been denied by the victim, is what constitutes hostile work environment sexual harassment. Common complaints in sexual harassment lawsuits include sexual gossip unrelated to work, jokes about physical contact inappropriate in workplace, commentary on physical appearance/attractiveness, joking about sex acts, fondling, suggestive remarks, sexually-suggestive photos displayed in the workplace, use of sexual language, or off-color jokes. Small matters, annoyances, and isolated incidents are usually not considered to be statutory violations of the discrimination laws. For a violation to impose liability, the conduct must create a work environment that would be intimidating, hostile, or offensive to a reasonable person. An employer can be held liable for failing to prevent these workplace conditions, unless it can prove that it attempted to prevent the harassment and that the employee failed to take advantage of existing harassment counter-measures or tools provided by the employer.

A hostile work environment may also be created when management acts in a manner designed to make an employee quit in retaliation for some action. For example, if an employee reported safety violations at work, was injured, attempted to join a union, or reported regulatory violations by management, and management's response was to harass and pressure the employee to quit. Employers have tried to force employees to quit by imposing unwarranted discipline, reducing hours, cutting wages, or transferring the complaining employee to a distant work location.

The United States Supreme Court stated in Oncale v. Sundowner Offshore Services, Inc. that Title VII is "not a general civility code". Thus, federal law does not prohibit simple teasing, offhand comments, or isolated incidents that are not extremely serious. Rather, the conduct must be so objectively offensive as to alter the conditions of the individual's employment. The conditions of employment are altered only if the harassment culminates in a tangible employment action or is sufficiently severe or pervasive.

== Workplace harassment precedent for the reasonable woman ==
The intricacy of workplace sexual harassment is not well represented by the reasonable woman criterion. It falls under the impression that a ‘reasonable woman’ does not get sexually harassed at work, thus creating a hostile workplace. Still, the article goes against the fact that that definition of a ‘reasonable woman’ is not entirely true to reality. The truth is that many women are dealing with hostile workplace environments. There are court cases that adopted the idea that sexual harassment creates a hostile workplace environment. The court case that shifted us from ‘reasonable person’ to ‘reasonable woman’ was Ellison v. Brady, 1991. This case is extremely important because it gave new meaning to the word. The new standard was behavior a reasonable woman would think was extreme enough to change the terms of employment and establish a hostile work environment.

== Burdens of proof ==
Where a hostile environment is alleged, the legality of behaviors must be determined on a case by case basis. In the workplace, such a claim focuses on the working conditions that must be experienced by the victim as a condition of employment, rather than on tangible job changes. To establish whether the situation is actionable the "totality of circumstances" must be weighed with an eye to determining "that the harassment affected a term, condition, or privilege of employment in that it was sufficiently severe or pervasive to alter the condition of the victim's employment and create an abusive working environment".

== Relation to other laws ==
In many United States jurisdictions, a hostile work environment is not an independent legal claim. That is, an employee could not file a lawsuit on the basis of a hostile work environment alone. Instead, an employee must prove they have been treated in a hostile manner because of their membership in a protected class, such as gender, age, race, national origin, disability status, and similar protected traits. Importantly, the hostile work environment is gender neutral, meaning that men can sexually harass men or women and women can sexually harass men or women.

Likewise, a hostile work environment can be considered the "adverse employment action" that is an element of a whistleblower claim or a reprisal (retaliation) claim under a civil rights statute. When an employee claims that a hostile work environment is an adverse employment action, the legal analysis is similar to the burdens of proof described above. However, to recover damages, the employee must also establish all other elements of the claim, such as that the employee engaged in protected conduct such as making a report of discrimination or reporting an employer's violation of law, and also establish that the employer created the hostile work environment, at least in part, because the employee engaged in the protected activity.

Cases

- EEOC v. Mitsubishi Motor Manufacturing of America
- Hostile Advances: The Kerry Ellison Story movie about Ellison v. Brady, which set the "reasonable woman" precedent in sexual harassment law.
- Jenson v. Eveleth Taconite Co.
  - North Country, a 2005 American film dealing with sexual harassment, inspired by Jenson v. Eveleth
- Meritor Savings Bank v. Vinson
- Oncale v. Sundowner Offshore Services
- Reeves v. C.H. Robinson Worldwide, Inc.
- Weaver v NATFHE
- Kyriazi v. Western Electric Company 1978
  - This case followed a female engineer who was constantly harassed both sexually and for her gender at work and when she complained about it to her supervisor they fired her. The court, however, sided with Kyriazi, and made history by being the first to acknowledge that it was considered discriminatory sexual harassment if a workplace was sexually hostile.
