= Frances McDormand =

American actor and producer (born 1957)

- McDormand in 2015
- Born: Cynthia Ann Smith; June 23, 1957 (age 69); Gibson City, Illinois, U.S.
- Education: Bethany College (B.A.); Yale University (M.F.A.)
- Occupations: Actress; producer
- Years active: 1982–present
- Works: Full list
- Spouse: Joel Coen (m. 1984)
- Children: 1
- Awards: Full list

Frances Louise McDormand (born Cynthia Ann Smith; June 23, 1957) is an American actress and film producer. In a career spanning over four decades, McDormand has received numerous accolades, including four Academy Awards, two Primetime Emmy Awards, and a Tony Award, making her one of the few performers to achieve the "Triple Crown of Acting". Additionally, she has received three British Academy Film Awards, two Golden Globe Awards and four Actor Awards. Recognized for her roles in small-budget independent films, McDormand's worldwide box office gross exceeds $2.2 billion.

McDormand has been married to Joel Coen of the Coen brothers since 1984. She has appeared in several of their films, including Blood Simple (1984), Raising Arizona (1987), Miller's Crossing (1990), Barton Fink (1991), Fargo (1996), The Man Who Wasn't There (2001), Burn After Reading (2008) and Hail, Caesar! (2016). McDormand won three Academy Awards for Best Actress for playing a pregnant police chief in Fargo (1996), a grieving mother seeking vengeance in Three Billboards Outside Ebbing, Missouri (2017) and a widowed nomad in Nomadland (2020). For producing the last, she was also awarded the Academy Award for Best Picture, making her the first person to win Academy Awards both as producer and performer for the same film. She was nominated for the Academy Award for Best Supporting Actress for her roles in Mississippi Burning (1988), Almost Famous (2000), and North Country (2005). McDormand is the second woman to win Best Actress three times (after Katharine Hepburn, who went on to win a total of four), and the seventh performer to win three acting Oscars. (Note: McDormand is after Katharine Hepburn (who has four in total), Walter Brennan, Ingrid Bergman, Jack Nicholson, Meryl Streep and Daniel Day-Lewis.)

On television, McDormand produced and starred as the titular protagonist in the HBO miniseries Olive Kitteridge (2014), which won her the Primetime Emmy Awards for Outstanding Lead Actress in a Limited Series or Movie and Outstanding Limited or Anthology Series. She had previously been nominated for Outstanding Supporting Actress in a Limited Series or Television Movie for her work in the Showtime film Hidden in America (1996). On stage, McDormand made her Broadway debut in a revival of Awake and Sing! (1984). She went on to win the Tony Award for Best Actress in a Play for her role as a troubled single mother in Good People (2011). She was previously nominated for her performance as Stella Kowalski in the 1988 revival of A Streetcar Named Desire.

== Early life and education ==
McDormand was born Cynthia Ann Smith on June 23, 1957, in Gibson City, Illinois. She was adopted at one and a half years of age by Noreen (Nickleson) and Vernon McDormand and renamed Frances Louise McDormand. Her adoptive mother was a nurse and receptionist while her adoptive father was a Disciples of Christ pastor; both were originally from Canada. McDormand has said that her biological mother—whom she has proudly described, along with herself, as "white trash"—may have been one of the parishioners at Vernon's church. She has a sister, Dorothy A. "Dot" McDormand, who is an ordained Disciples of Christ minister and chaplain, as well as a brother, Kenneth, both of whom also were adopted by the McDormands, who had no biological children.

Because McDormand's father specialized in restoring congregations, he frequently moved their family, and they lived in several small towns in Illinois, Georgia, Kentucky, and Tennessee, before settling in Monessen, Pennsylvania, where McDormand graduated from Monessen High School in 1975. She attended Bethany College in West Virginia, earning a Bachelor of Arts degree in theater in 1979. In 1982, she earned a Master of Fine Arts degree from the Yale School of Drama. She was a roommate of actress Holly Hunter while living in New York City.

== Career ==
=== 1980s: Early work and breakthrough ===
McDormand's first professional acting role was in Derek Walcott's play In a Fine Castle also known as The Last Carnival, which was funded by the MacArthur Foundation and performed in Trinidad. In 1984, she made her film debut in Blood Simple, the first film by her husband Joel Coen and brother-in-law Ethan Coen. In 1985, McDormand appeared in Sam Raimi's Crimewave, as well as an episode of Hunter. In 1987, she appeared as eccentric friend Dot in Raising Arizona, starring Holly Hunter and Nicolas Cage. In addition to her early film roles, McDormand played Connie Chapman in the fifth season of the television police drama Hill Street Blues, and appeared in a 1986 episode of The Twilight Zone. In 1988, she played Stella Kowalski in a stage production of Tennessee Williams' A Streetcar Named Desire, for which she was nominated for a Tony Award for Best Actress in a Play. McDormand is an associate member of the experimental theater company The Wooster Group. In 2002, "the game and talented" McDormand performed as Oenone in the Wooster Group's production of an "exhilarating dissection" of Racine's tragedy Phèdre entitled To You, the Birdie!, at St. Ann's Warehouse in Brooklyn, New York.

After appearing in several theatrical and television roles during the 1980s, McDormand gradually gained renown and critical acclaim for her dramatic work in film. In 1989, she was nominated for the Academy Award for Best Supporting Actress for Mississippi Burning (1988). Cast alongside Gene Hackman and Willem Dafoe, McDormand was singled out for praise, with Sheila Benson in her review for the Los Angeles Times writing, "Hackman's mastery reaches a peak here, but McDormand soars right with him. And since she is the film's sole voice of morality, it's right that she is so memorable."

=== 1990s: Fargo and worldwide recognition ===
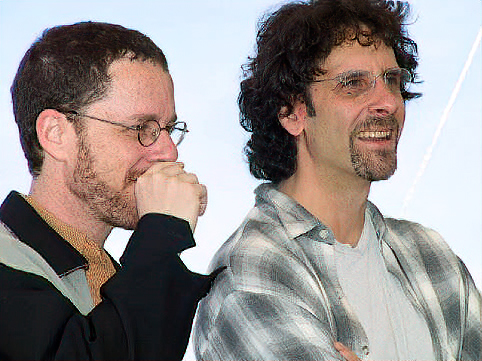
McDormand has frequently collaborated with the Coen brothers, including Fargo, for which she won her first Academy Award for Best Actress

In 1990, McDormand teamed again with director Sam Raimi for Darkman, in which she co-starred alongside Liam Neeson. The film was a critical and commercial success, with film critics Gene Siskel and Roger Ebert giving the film "two thumbs up" on the TV program At the Movies. That same year, she appeared in the Coen brothers' Miller's Crossing and starred in the political thriller Hidden Agenda alongside Brian Cox, which was met with further critical acclaim, and won the Jury Prize at the 1990 Cannes Film Festival. The following year, McDormand had an uncredited voice role in the Coen brothers' Barton Fink and appeared alongside Demi Moore and Jeff Daniels in the romantic comedy The Butcher's Wife. In 1992, she co-starred in the television film Crazy in Love with Holly Hunter and Gena Rowlands. In 1993, McDormand co-starred in Robert Altman's ensemble film Short Cuts, based on stories by Raymond Carver. The film was critically acclaimed, with the cast receiving a special Volpi Cup for Best Ensemble at the 50th Venice International Film Festival, as well as a Special Ensemble Award at the 51st Golden Globe Awards.

In 1996, McDormand starred as pregnant police Chief Marge Gunderson in Fargo, written and directed by the Coen brothers. She garnered widespread critical acclaim for her performance, and won the Academy Award for Best Actress, and the Screen Actors Guild Award for Outstanding Performance by a Female Actor in a Leading Role. Roger Ebert called Fargo "one of the best films I've ever seen" and asserted that McDormand "should have a lock on an Academy Award nomination with this performance, which is true in every individual moment, and yet slyly, quietly, over the top in its cumulative effect." In 2003, the character of Marge Gunderson as portrayed by McDormand was ranked the 33rd greatest screen hero by AFI's 100 Years...100 Heroes & Villains. Also in 1996, McDormand played Edward Norton's psychiatrist Dr. Molly Arrington in the legal thriller Primal Fear, and appeared alongside Chris Cooper in the neo-Western mystery film Lone Star.

In 1997, McDormand received a Primetime Emmy Award nomination for Outstanding Supporting Actress in a Limited Series or Television Movie for her role as Gus in the television film Hidden in America (1996). That same year, she co-starred alongside Glenn Close in Bruce Beresford's war drama Paradise Road. In 1998, McDormand played the strict but loving nun Miss Clara Clavel in the family film Madeline.

=== 2000s: Established actress ===
In 2001, McDormand was nominated for the Academy Award for Best Supporting Actress and the Golden Globe Award for Best Supporting Actress for her portrayal of an overbearing mother in Almost Famous (2000). For her role in Wonder Boys (2000), she won Best Supporting Actress from the Florida Film Critics Circle and the Los Angeles Film Critics Association. For her roles in both films, she won the Broadcast Film Critics Association award for Best Supporting Actress. McDormand starred as Billy Bob Thornton's wife Doris Crane in the Coen Brothers' film noir The Man Who Wasn't There (2001). In 2002, she starred alongside Robert De Niro in the crime drama City by the Sea, and as free-spirited record producer Jane in Laurel Canyon, which earned her an Independent Spirit Award nomination for Best Supporting Female. The following year, she played Diane Keaton's sister Zoe in the romantic comedy Something's Gotta Give. In 2005, McDormand co-starred alongside Charlize Theron in the true life drama North Country, which earned her Academy Award, BAFTA Award, Golden Globe Award, and Screen Actors Guild Award nominations for Best Supporting Actress. That same year, she also appeared alongside Theron in the science fiction action film Æon Flux.

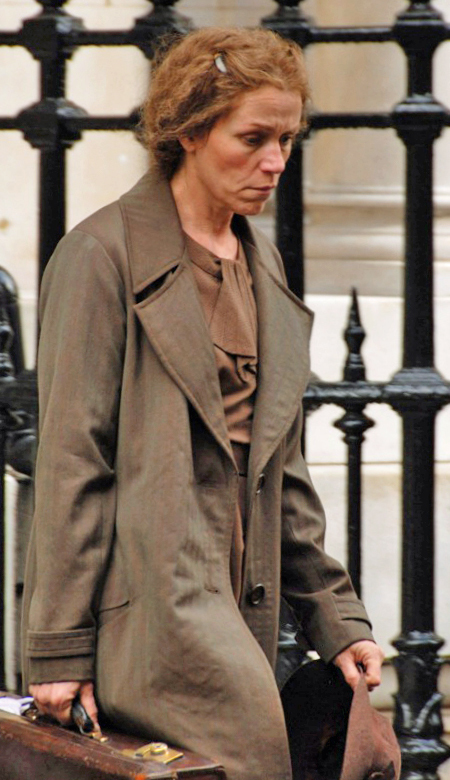
McDormand on the set of Miss Pettigrew Lives for a Day in 2007

In 2007, McDormand won an Independent Spirit Award for her supporting role in Nicole Holofcener's dark comedy Friends with Money (2006). She also voiced the role of the principal Melanie Upfoot in The Simpsons episode "Girls Just Want to Have Sums", which aired on April 30, 2006. In 2008, McDormand starred in the romantic comedy Miss Pettigrew Lives for a Day alongside Amy Adams as governess Guinevere Pettigrew, and the black comedy Burn After Reading, which earned her a Golden Globe nomination for Best Actress – Motion Picture Comedy or Musical.

=== 2010s: Continued success and critical acclaim ===
In 2011, she appeared alongside Sean Penn in This Must Be the Place, and alongside her Burn After Reading co-star John Malkovich in the action movie Transformers: Dark of the Moon, playing the US government's National Intelligence Director Charlotte Mearing. She returned to the stage in the David Lindsay-Abaire play Good People, in a limited engagement on Broadway from February 8, 2011, to May 29, 2011. Her performance won her the Tony Award for Best Actress in a Play. In the animated film Madagascar 3: Europe's Most Wanted (2012), McDormand voiced Captain Chantel DuBois and also sang a version of the French song "Non, je ne regrette rien". That same year, she co-starred in Wes Anderson's ensemble film Moonrise Kingdom, and alongside Matt Damon in Promised Land. Although primarily recognized for her roles in independent films she has gained a box office gross of $2.2 billion. helped by her appearances in Dark of the Moon and Europe's Most Wanted.

In November 2014, HBO aired a four-part miniseries based upon the series of short stories by Elizabeth Strout, Olive Kitteridge, co-produced by and starring McDormand. For her performance in the title role, she won the Primetime Emmy Award for Outstanding Lead Actress in a Limited Series or Movie and the Screen Actors Guild Award for Outstanding Performance by a Female Actor in a Miniseries or Television Movie. With her Emmy win, McDormand became the twelfth actress in history to achieve the "Triple Crown of Acting", for competitive Oscar, Emmy, and Tony Award wins in acting categories. As a co-producer on Olive Kitteridge, McDormand also won the Primetime Emmy Award for Outstanding Limited Series. In 2015, McDormand voiced Momma Ida in the Pixar animated film The Good Dinosaur. In 2016, she starred in the Coen brothers' Hail, Caesar!.

In 2017, McDormand starred in Three Billboards Outside Ebbing, Missouri as Mildred Hayes, a grieving mother who rents three roadside billboards to call attention to her daughter's unsolved rape and murder. Her performance garnered enormous critical acclaim, and she won her second Academy Award for Best Actress (her statuette was stolen briefly following the awards ceremony), the BAFTA Award for Best Actress in a Leading Role, the Golden Globe Award for Best Actress in a Motion Picture – Drama, and the Screen Actors Guild Award for Outstanding Performance by a Female Actor in a Leading Role. During that year's awards season, she drew significant media attention for her feminist provoking acceptance speeches which came with the advent of the Time's Up and Me Too movements.

In 2018, McDormand voiced Interpreter Nelson in Wes Anderson's stop-motion animated film Isle of Dogs. The following year, she voiced God in the six-episode Amazon/BBC Studios series Good Omens, starring Michael Sheen and David Tennant.

=== 2020s: Nomadland and further critical success ===
In 2020, McDormand produced and starred in Chloé Zhao's Nomadland, playing Fern, a nomad in the American West. McDormand received universal acclaim for her performance, winning her third Academy Award for Best Actress and her second BAFTA Award for Best Actress, and earning nominations for the Golden Globe Award and Screen Actors Guild Award for Best Actress. As a producer on the film, McDormand also won the Academy Award, BAFTA Award, and Golden Globe Award for Best Picture. Her wins for Nomadland made her the first person in history to win Academy Awards both as producer and performer for the same film, the second woman in history to win Best Actress three times, and the seventh performer overall to win three competitive Academy Awards in acting categories. In 2021, McDormand received further critical acclaim for her performances as Lady Macbeth in Joel Coen's The Tragedy of Macbeth and Lucinda Krementz in Wes Anderson's The French Dispatch.

In 2022, McDormand produced and appeared in Women Talking. The film was met with critical acclaim and was nominated for Best Picture at the 95th Academy Awards.

== Reception and acting style ==
Throughout her career spanning over four decades, McDormand has appeared in a wide variety of projects on the screen and stage, portraying various characters for which she has frequently received critical acclaim. Vogue remarked that she is "long considered one of our greatest living performers" and that "she grounds every performance with an innate truthfulness. McDormand makes you believe every person she plays is a flesh-and-blood human who continues living out their life once the cameras stop rolling." In his review of Laurel Canyon (2002), film critic Roger Ebert wrote "In almost all of her roles, McDormand embodies an immediate, present, physical, functioning, living, breathing person as well as any actor ever has, and she plays radically different roles as easily as she walks... How she does it is a mystery, but she does, reinventing herself, role after role. McDormand is ascendant." In his review of Nomadland (2020), film critic Leonard Maltin refers to McDormand as "one of the finest actresses on the planet," stating "because [Fern] is played by McDormand, there is no better way to establish a connection between her and us in the audience. We know she is genuine; there is no artifice here."

== Personal life ==
McDormand has been married to director Joel Coen since 1984. In 1995, they adopted a son from Paraguay when he was six months old. The family lives in Marin County, California.

== Acting credits and awards ==
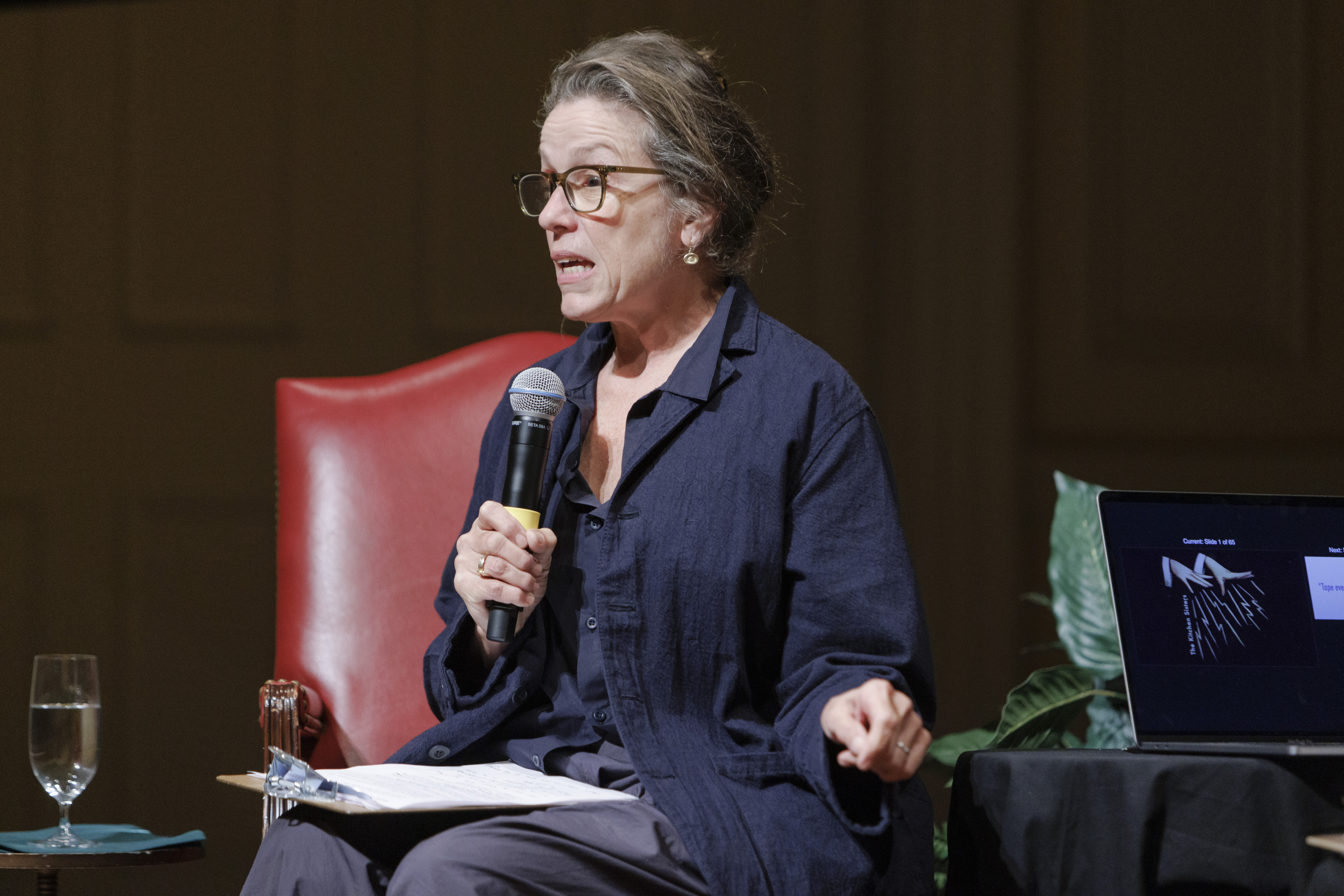
McDormand in 2022

McDormand has received numerous accolades, including three BAFTA Awards, two Golden Globe Awards, two Primetime Emmy Awards, four Actor Awards, and one Tony Award. She has received three Academy Awards for Best Actress for her performances in Fargo (1996), Three Billboards Outside Ebbing, Missouri (2017), and Nomadland (2020). For producing the latter, she was also awarded the Academy Award for Best Picture, making her the first person in history to win Academy Awards both as producer and performer for the same film.

She has received eight Academy Award nominations total (six for acting, two for producing), for the following films:

- 61st Academy Awards: Best Supporting Actress, nomination, for Mississippi Burning (1988)
- 69th Academy Awards: Best Actress, win, for Fargo (1996)
- 73rd Academy Awards: Best Supporting Actress, nomination, for Almost Famous (2000)
- 78th Academy Awards: Best Supporting Actress, nomination, for North Country (2005)
- 90th Academy Awards, Best Actress, win, for Three Billboards Outside Ebbing, Missouri (2017)
- 93rd Academy Awards, Best Actress, win, for Nomadland (2020)
- 93rd Academy Awards, Best Picture, win, for Nomadland (2020)
- 95th Academy Awards, Best Picture, nomination, for Women Talking (2022)

McDormand's most acclaimed films, according to the review-aggregation website Rotten Tomatoes, include:

- Blood Simple (1984)
- Raising Arizona (1987)
- Mississippi Burning (1988)
- Darkman (1990)
- Hidden Agenda (1990)
- Short Cuts (1993)
- Fargo (1996)
- Primal Fear (1996)
- Lone Star (1996)
- Wonder Boys (2000)
- Almost Famous (2000)
- The Man Who Wasn't There (2001)
- Burn After Reading (2008)
- Miss Pettigrew Lives for a Day (2008)
- Moonrise Kingdom (2012)
- Madagascar 3: Europe's Most Wanted (2012)
- The Good Dinosaur (2015)
- Hail, Caesar! (2016)
- Three Billboards Outside Ebbing, Missouri (2017)
- Isle of Dogs (2018)
- Nomadland (2020)
- The French Dispatch (2021)
- The Tragedy of Macbeth (2021)
- Women Talking (2022)

== See also ==
- List of American film actresses
- List of actors with Academy Award nominations
- List of actors with two or more Academy Awards in acting categories
- List of actors with two or more Academy Award nominations in acting categories
- List of oldest and youngest Academy Award winners and nominees — Oldest winners for Best Actress in a Leading Role
- List of Primetime Emmy Award winners
- List of Golden Globe winners
