= Reeves v. C.H. Robinson Worldwide, Inc. =

US labor law case

Reeves v CH Robinson Worldwide, Inc
- Court: Court of Appeals, Eleventh Circuit
- Decided: January 20, 2010
- Citation: 5 No. 07-10270 (11th Cir. January 20, 2010)

Keywords
- Discrimination, harassment

Reeves v CH Robinson Worldwide, Inc, 5 No. 07-10270 (11th Cir. January 20, 2010) is a US labor law case under Title VII of the Civil Rights Act of 1964 heard before the United States Court of Appeals for the Eleventh Circuit which ruled that a hostile work environment can be created in a workplace where sexually explicit language and pornography are present. A hostile workplace may exist even if it is not targeted at any particular employee.

== Facts ==
Ms. Reeves was the only woman working in her area as a transportation sales representative in the Birmingham, Ala., office of C.H. Robinson, an Eden Prairie, Minnesota-based transportation services firm. In her lawsuit she claimed that "sexually offensive language permeated the work environment" from both her co-workers and her supervisor. Sexually explicit radio programming played on a daily basis and when she complained about it she was told it was up to her to play her own radio stations. When she did change the channel others would change it back. She resigned in 2004 and filed a complaint in 2006, claiming that the sexually offensive language created a hostile work environment.

A lower court dismissed her case granting summary judgment to her employer. Reeves appealed.

== Judgment ==
The United States Court of Appeals for the Eleventh Circuit ruled that a hostile work environment can be created in a workplace where sexually explicit language and pornography are present. A hostile workplace may exist even if it is not targeted at any particular employee.

== See also ==
- US labor law
