= Oncale v. Sundowner Offshore Services, Inc. =

- Supreme Court of the United States

Argued December 8, 1997 Decided March 4, 1998
- Full case name: Joseph Oncale v. Sundowner Offshore Services, Inc.
- Citations: 523 U.S. 75 (more) 118 S. Ct. 998; 140 L. Ed. 2d 201

Case history
- Prior: 83 F.3d 118 (5th Cir. 1996); rehearing en banc denied, 95 F.3d 56 (5th Cir. 1996); cert. granted, 520 U.S. 1263 (1997).

Holding
- The protection against discrimination on the basis of sex under Title VII of the Civil Rights Act of 1964 is applicable to sexual harassment between members of the same sex.

Court membership
- Chief Justice William Rehnquist Associate Justices John P. Stevens · Sandra Day O'Connor; Antonin Scalia · Anthony Kennedy; David Souter · Clarence Thomas; Ruth Bader Ginsburg · Stephen Breyer

Case opinions
- Majority: Scalia, joined by unanimous
- Concurrence: Thomas

Laws applied
- Title VII of the Civil Rights Act of 1964

Oncale v. Sundowner Offshore Services, 523 U.S. 75 (1998), is a landmark decision of the US Supreme Court. The case arose out of a suit for sex discrimination by a male oil-rig worker, who claimed that he was repeatedly subjected to sexual harassment by his male co-workers with the acquiescence of his employer. The Court held that the protection of Title VII of the Civil Rights Act of 1964 against workplace discrimination "because of... sex" applied to harassment in the workplace between members of the same sex.

== Background ==
In late October 1991, Joseph Oncale was working for Sundowner Offshore Services on a Chevron USA Inc. oil platform in the Gulf of Mexico. He was employed as a roustabout on an eight-man crew. On several occasions, Oncale was forcibly subjected to sex-related, humiliating actions against him by his coworkers in the presence of the rest of the crew. Oncale was also sodomized with a bar of soap and threatened with rape. Oncale's complaints to supervisory personnel produced no remedial action. Instead, the company's Safety Compliance Clerk called him a name suggesting homosexuality. Oncale eventually quit, asking that his pink slip reflect that he "voluntarily left due to sexual harassment and verbal abuse."

Oncale filed a complaint against Sundowner in the United States District Court for the Eastern District of Louisiana, alleging that he was discriminated against in his employment because of his sex. Relying on earlier precedents, the district court granted summary judgment to the defendant: "Mr. Oncale, a male, has no cause of action under Title VII for harassment by male co-workers." Oncale appealed, and the United States Court of Appeals for the Fifth Circuit affirmed the decision. After granting a petition for writ of certiorari, the Supreme Court reversed the decision.

== Decision ==
Justice Scalia, writing for the unanimous court (with Justice Thomas concurring), reversed the decision of the district court and remanded the case for further proceedings in accordance with the instruction that a male can be discriminated against by members of the same sex under Title VII.

Oncale v. Sundowner Offshore Services set the precedent for analyzing same-sex harassment and sexual harassment without motivation of "sexual desire" by stating that any discrimination based on sex is actionable if it places the victim in an objectively-disadvantageous working condition, regardless of the sex of the victim or the harasser.

The case was subsequently remanded by the United States Court of Appeals for the Fifth Circuit to the trial court. The case was then settled out of court.

== Impact and implementation ==
The application of the Oncale case has caused some difficulty in the lower federal courts, which have struggled with how to determine whether any particular case of same-sex harassment is "because of sex." In particular, courts have struggled with how to deal with harassment that appears to be based on actual or perceived sexual orientation because employment discrimination based on sexual orientation was not explicitly forbidden by federal law.

In July 2015, the Equal Employment Opportunity Commission determined that employment discrimination based on sexual orientation was illegal under Title VII of the Civil Rights Act of 1964 and used the Oncale decision as a basis.

Because it set a precedent regarding harassment "because of sex," Oncale v. Sundowner has been lauded as a landmark gay rights case, even though all those involved were heterosexual. In the Court's opinion in Oncale, the inclusion of sexual discrimination between same sex individuals as a protected class under Title VII set an important precedent of expanding the interpretation of protected classes under § 2000e-2(a)(1). This precedent was later reflected upon in Bostock v. Clayton County along with two other important cases, all of which considered the word "sex" and its definition in regards to Title VII of the Civil Rights Act of 1964.

== See also ==
- Hostile work environment
- English v. Sanderson Blinds Ltd
- Meritor Savings Bank v. Vinson
- Hostile Advances: The Kerry Ellison Story movie about Ellison v. Brady which set the "reasonable woman" precedent in sexual harassment law.
- Jenson v. Eveleth Taconite Co.
- List of United States Supreme Court cases, volume 523
- List of LGBT-related cases in the United States Supreme Court
