= North Country (film) =

2005 film by Niki Caro

- Theatrical release poster
- Directed by: Niki Caro
- Written by: Michael Seitzman
- Based on: Class Action: The Story of Lois Jenson and the Landmark Case That Changed Sexual Harassment Law; 2002 book by Clara Bingham; Laura Leedy Gansler
- Produced by: Nick Wechsler
- Starring: Charlize Theron; Frances McDormand; Sean Bean; Richard Jenkins; Jeremy Renner; Michelle Monaghan; Woody Harrelson; Sissy Spacek
- Cinematography: Chris Menges
- Edited by: David Coulson
- Music by: Gustavo Santaolalla
- Production companies: Participant Productions; Industry Entertainment; Nick Wechsler Productions
- Distributed by: Warner Bros. Pictures
- Release dates: September 12, 2005 (TIFF); October 21, 2005
- Running time: 126 minutes
- Country: United States
- Language: English
- Budget: $35 million
- Box office: $25.2 million

North Country is a 2005 American legal drama film directed by Niki Caro, starring Charlize Theron, Frances McDormand, Sean Bean, Richard Jenkins, Michelle Monaghan, Jeremy Renner, Woody Harrelson, and Sissy Spacek. The screenplay by Michael Seitzman was inspired by the 2002 book Class Action: The Story of Lois Jenson and the Landmark Case That Changed Sexual Harassment Law by Clara Bingham and Laura Leedy Gansler, which chronicled the case of Jenson v. Eveleth Taconite Company and USW Local 2705 which supported the employer's efforts through the horrific events and ensuing legal battles.

North Country premiered at the Toronto International Film Festival on September 12, 2005 before being released by Warner Bros. Pictures on October 21, 2005. The film received positive reviews from critics, but underperformed at the box office, grossing $25.2 million against a $35 million budget. At the 78th Academy Awards, Theron and McDormand were nominated for the Academy Award for Best Actress and Academy Award for Best Supporting Actress, respectively.

== Plot ==
In 1989, Josey Aimes flees from her abusive husband with her children, Sammy and Karen. She returns to her hometown in northern Minnesota's Mesabi Iron Range to live with her parents, Alice and Hank. Hank is ashamed of his daughter, who had Sammy as a teenager by an unknown father: he believes she is promiscuous. While working in a hair salon, Josey reconnects with former acquaintance, Glory Dodge. She works at the local iron mine who suggests she do the same, as a job there pays six times her current wage.

When Josey takes the job, her relationship with Hank becomes more strained. He also works at the mine and believes that women should not be working there, so Josey and her children move in with Glory and her husband, Kyle. Josey quickly befriends several other female workers at the mine but soon realizes the women are constant targets for sexual harassment and humiliation by most of their male co-workers. They, like Hank, believe that their jobs are more appropriate for men.

Josey in particular is targeted by Bobby Sharp, her ex-boyfriend from high school. She tries to talk to her supervisor, Arlen Pavich, about the problem, but he refuses to take her concerns seriously. The women experience additional harassment and even abuse in retaliation. After Josey rebuffs Bobby's sexual advances, he spreads rumors that she attempted to seduce him, leading to his wife publicly berating her at Sammy's hockey game. Sammy starts to believe the gossip about his mother's alleged promiscuity.

Josey takes her concerns to the mine's owner, but his previous assurances that he is there to help are a ruse. She arrives to find that he has invited Pavich to the meeting, along with several executives. Pearson offers only to accept her resignation immediately, but she refuses. After he implies that he believes the rumors about her promiscuity, she leaves devastated. Later, after being physically and sexually assaulted by Bobby at work, Josey resigns. She then asks Bill White, a lawyer friend of Kyle and Glory, to help her file a lawsuit against the company. He advises her to recruit other women to form a class action lawsuit, which would be the first of its kind.

The female miners, however, fear losing their jobs and are facing additional harassment, so Josey attempts to go ahead with the case alone. She also discovers that Glory has Lou Gehrig's disease, and her health is declining rapidly. Alice and Hank argue over Josey's lawsuit, and when Hank still refuses to forgive his daughter, Alice leaves him. At a union meeting, Josey attempts to address the miners to explain her reasons for suing the mine, but they constantly heckle and insult her, leading Hank to take the microphone and reprimand his co-workers for their treatment of Josey and all the women at the mine, garnering some reluctant applause. He and Alice then reconcile.

In court, the mining company's attorney attempts to hold Josey's sexual history against her, based on Bobby's testimony that Sammy is the result of a consensual sexual relationship between Josey and her high school teacher, Paul Lattavansky. Josey then reveals that after school one day, where she and Bobby had been serving detention together after being caught kissing, she was raped by Lattavansky, which led to her pregnancy with Sammy. The teacher is present at the meeting and Hank attacks him. Bill gets a recess after Josey storms out of the courtroom.

Sammy still refuses to believe his mother and runs away, staying with Kyle and Glory, until Kyle urges him to reconsider. He and Josey embrace after talking. While cross-examining Bobby, Bill gets him to admit he witnessed Lattavansky rape Josey, but was too scared to do anything about it. Glory, who has come to the court in her wheelchair and is unable to speak, has Kyle read a letter saying she stands with Josey, though it is still not enough to qualify for a class action suit. After a pause, many other women stand, followed by family members and even several male miners who were never involved in the case. The mining company is forced to pay the women for their suffering and establish a landmark sexual harassment policy at the workplace.

== Cast ==
- Charlize Theron as Josephine "Josey" Aimes
  - Amber Heard as young Josey Aimes
- Frances McDormand as Glory Dodge
- Sean Bean as Kyle Dodge
- Richard Jenkins as Henry "Hank" Aimes
- Jeremy Renner as Robert "Bobby" Sharp
  - Cole Williams as young Bobby Sharp
- Michelle Monaghan as Sherry
- Thomas Curtis as Samuel "Sammy" Aimes
- Woody Harrelson as Bill White
- Sissy Spacek as Alice Aimes
- Tom Bower as Gray Suchett
- Linda Emond as Leslie Conlin
- Rusty Schwimmer as Big Betty
- Jillian Armenante as Peg
- Xander Berkeley as Arlen Pavich
- Chris Mulkey as Earl Slangley
- Corey Stoll as Ricky Sennett
- Brad William Henke as Mr. Lattavansky
- John Aylward as Judge Halsted
- Marcus Chait as Wayne

== Production ==
Lois Jenson, on whom the character of Josey is based, actually began working at the EVTAC (from "Eveleth Taconite") mine in Eveleth, Minnesota in 1975 and initiated her lawsuit in 1984, four years before the year in which the film begins. The film condensed the timeline, but in reality it took fourteen years for the case to be settled. Jenson refused an offer to consult on the film and would not sell the rights to her story; thus, the filmmakers created a fictionalized account with original characters.

The character Glory Dodge, played by Frances McDormand, was based on Pat Kosmach, one of the original plaintiffs in the class action suit. Kosmach died partway through the case, on November 7, 1994. Eveleth Mines settled four years later, in December 1998, paying fifteen women a total of $3.5 million.

The film was shot in the northern Minnesota towns of Eveleth, Virginia, Chisholm, and Hibbing. Parts were also shot in Minneapolis; as well as Silver City and Santa Fe in New Mexico.

== Soundtrack ==
Professional ratings
Review scores
Source	Rating
AllMusic	3/5 stars

1. "North Country" by Gustavo Santaolalla – 2:08
2. "Girl of the North Country" by Leo Kottke – 3:33
3. "Tell Ol' Bill" by Bob Dylan – 5:08
4. "Werewolves of London" by Warren Zevon – 3:28
5. "Bette Davis Eyes" by Kim Carnes – 3:49
6. "If I Said You Had a Beautiful Body (Would You Hold It Against Me)" by The Bellamy Brothers – 3:17
7. "Lay Lady Lay" by Bob Dylan – 3:19
8. "A Saturday in My Classroom" by Gustavo Santaolalla – 3:46
9. "Sweetheart Like You" by Bob Dylan – 4:37
10. "Baby Don't Get Hooked on Me" by Mac Davis – 3:05
11. "Do Right to Me Baby (Do Unto Others)" by Bob Dylan – 3:52
12. "Standing Up" by Gustavo Santaolalla – 2:43
13. "Paths of Victory" by Cat Power – 3:24

Songs from the film not on the soundtrack album include "Wasn't That a Party" by The Irish Rovers, "Shake the House Down" by Molly Hatchet and karaoke versions of George Thorogood's "I Drink Alone" and Pat Benatar's "Hit Me with Your Best Shot."

== Release ==
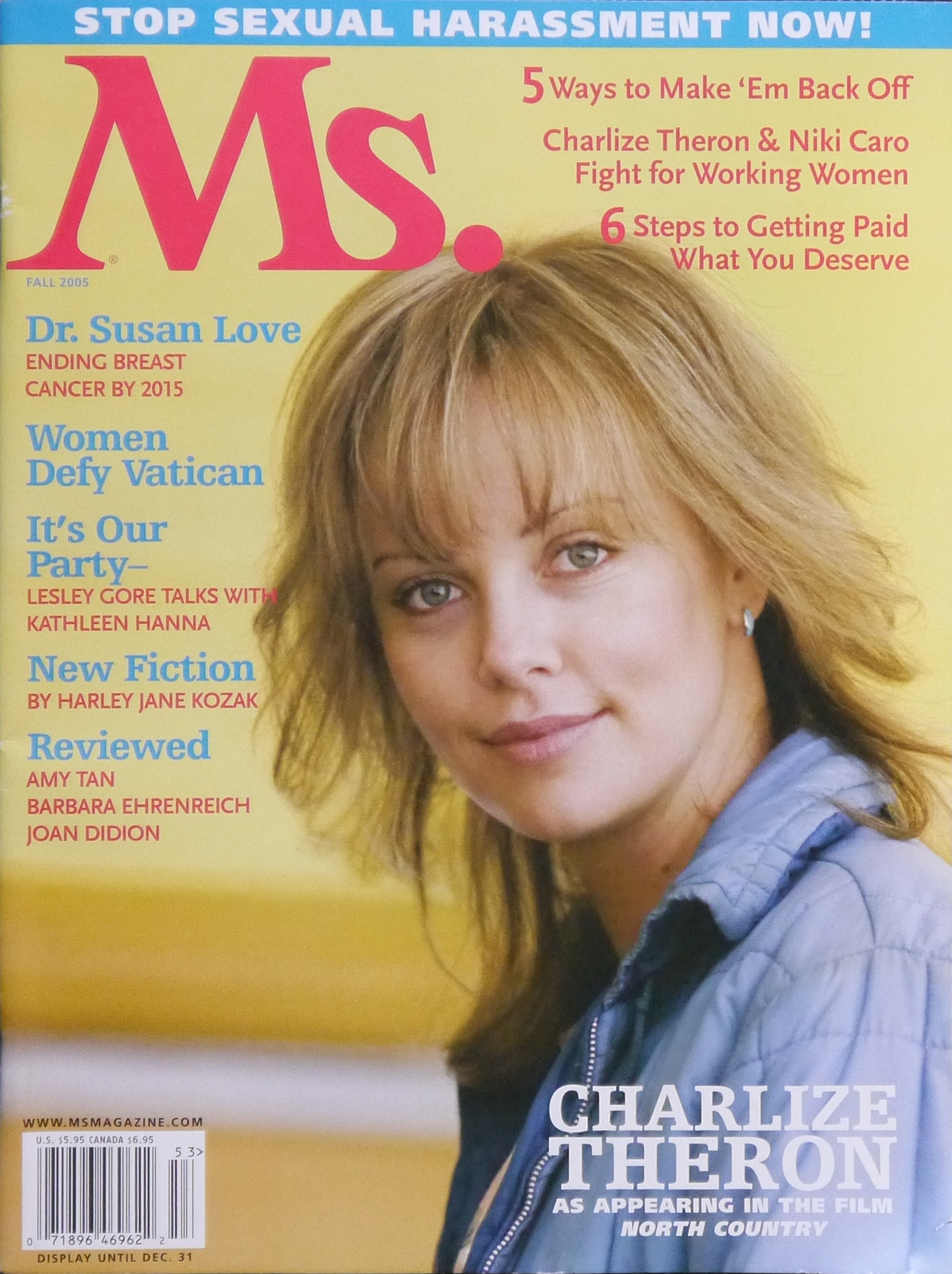
Charlize Theron on the cover of Ms. magazine upon the release of North Country

The film premiered at the 2005 Toronto International Film Festival and was shown at the Chicago International Film Festival before going into theatrical release in the US, where it grossed $6,422,455 in its opening weekend, ranking 5th at the box office. Budgeted at $35 million, it eventually grossed $18,337,722 in the US and $6,873,453 in foreign markets for a total worldwide box office of $25,211,175.

== Reception ==
=== Critical response ===
On the review aggregator Rotten Tomatoes, 70% of critics gave the film positive reviews, based on 174 reviews, and an average rating of 6.7/10, with Theron and McDormand receiving critical acclaim for their performances. The site's consensus states: "Though sometimes melodramatic and formulaic, North Country is nonetheless a rousing, powerful story of courage and humanity." On Metacritic, the film has an average score of 68 out of 100, based on 39 reviews. Audiences polled by CinemaScore gave the film an average grade of "A−" on an A+ to F scale.

Manohla Dargis of The New York Times called it "a star vehicle with heart – an old-fashioned liberal weepie about truth and justice" and added, "[It] is one of those Hollywood entertainments that stri/ve to tell a hard, bitter story with as much uplift as possible. That the film works as well as it does, delivering a tough first hour only to disintegrate like a wet newspaper, testifies to the skill of the filmmakers as well as to the constraints brought on them by an industry that insists on slapping a pretty bow on even the foulest truth."

In his review in the Chicago Sun-Times, Roger Ebert observed, "North Country is one of those movies that stir you up and make you mad, because it dramatizes practices you've heard about but never really visualized. We remember that Frances McDormand played a woman police officer in this same area in Fargo, and we value that memory because it provides a foundation for Josey Aimes. McDormand's role in this movie is different and much sadder, but brings the same pluck and common sense to the screen. Put these two women together (as actors and characters) and they can accomplish just about anything. Watching them do it is a great movie experience."

Ruthe Stein of the San Francisco Chronicle called the film a "compelling if occasionally unnecessarily convoluted movie . . . The first 15 minutes or so are a mess . . . Fortunately, [it] calms down and becomes extremely engrossing, especially in the courtroom battles . . . it's all carefully calculated for dramatic effect and succeeds brilliantly in drawing you in and eliciting tears in the process . . . North Country would have benefited from crisper editing. It runs at least 15 minutes longer than necessary . . . For all its flaws, [it] delivers an emotional wallop and a couple of performances worthy of recognition come award time."

In Rolling Stone, Peter Travers awarded the film two out of a possible four stars and commented, "Any similarities between Josey and Lois Jenson, the real woman who made Eveleth Mines pay for their sins in a landmark 1988 class-action suit, are purely coincidental. Instead, we get a TV-movie fantasy of female empowerment glazed with soap opera theatrics. The actors, director Niki Caro (Whale Rider) and the great cinematographer Chris Menges all labor to make things look authentic. But a crock is a crock, despite the ferocity and feeling Theron brings to the role . . . Though the dirt and grime in North Country are artfully applied, it's purely cosmetic and skin-deep."

In "Stories from North Country," a documentary accompanying the film on the DVD, Lois Jenson, on whom the story is based, said, "I think it's important for people to see this." Regarding Charlize Theron, Jenson said, "She has the character. [...] She knew the part. She knew what it needed – the depth she needed to go to. She's done a great job with it."

David Rooney of Variety said, "[It] indulges in movie-ish manipulation in its climactic courtroom scenes. But it remains an emotionally potent story told with great dignity, to which women especially will respond . . . The film represents a confident next step for lead Charlize Theron. Though the challenges of following a career-redefining Oscar role have stymied actresses, Theron segues from Monster to a performance in many ways more accomplished . . . The strength of both the performance and character anchor the film firmly in the tradition of other dramas about working-class women leading the fight over industrial workplace issues, such as Norma Rae or Silkwood."

In the St. Petersburg Times, Steve Persall graded the film A and called it "deeply, undeniably moving . . . crusader cinema at its finest."

=== Awards and nominations ===
Award	Date of ceremony	Category	Recipient(s)	Result
Academy Awards	March 5, 2006	Best Actress	Charlize Theron	Nominated
Academy Awards	March 5, 2006	Best Supporting Actress	Frances McDormand	Nominated
Golden Globe Awards	January 16, 2006	Best Actress – Motion Picture Drama	Charlize Theron	Nominated
Golden Globe Awards	January 16, 2006	Best Supporting Actress – Motion Picture	Frances McDormand	Nominated
British Academy Film Awards	February 19, 2006	Best Actress in a Leading Role	Charlize Theron	Nominated
British Academy Film Awards	February 19, 2006	Best Actress in a Supporting Role	Frances McDormand	Nominated
Screen Actors Guild Awards	January 29, 2006	Outstanding Performance by a Female Actor in a Leading Role	Charlize Theron	Nominated
Screen Actors Guild Awards	January 29, 2006	Outstanding Performance by a Female Actor in a Supporting Role	Frances McDormand	Nominated
Critics' Choice Awards	January 9, 2006	Best Actress	Charlize Theron	Nominated
Critics' Choice Awards	January 9, 2006	Best Supporting Actress	Frances McDormand	Nominated
Satellite Awards	December 17, 2005	Best Actress – Motion Picture	Charlize Theron	Nominated
Satellite Awards	December 17, 2005	Best Supporting Actress – Motion Picture	Frances McDormand	Nominated
Chicago International Film Festival	October 20, 2005	Audience Choice Award - Best Film	Niki Caro	Won
Dallas–Fort Worth Film Critics Association	December 19, 2005	Best Actress	Charlize Theron	Nominated
Las Vegas Film Critics Society	December 19, 2005	Best Supporting Actress	Frances McDormand	Won
St. Louis Gateway Film Critics Association	January 8, 2006	Best Actress	Charlize Theron	Nominated
St. Louis Gateway Film Critics Association	January 8, 2006	Best Supporting Actress	Frances McDormand	Nominated
Vancouver Film Critics Circle	February 7, 2006	Best Actress	Charlize Theron	Nominated
Washington D.C. Area Film Critics Association	December 12, 2005	Best Actress	Charlize Theron	Nominated

== See also ==
- List of American films of 2005
- Sexual harassment
- Hostile work environment
- Wildrose
- Michelle Vinson v. Merit One Savings Bank
- Oncale v. Sundowner Offshore Services
