= Hidden in America =

- DVD cover
- Genre: Drama
- Written by: Peter Silverman; Michael De Guzma
- Directed by: Martin Bell
- Starring: Beau Bridges; Bruce Davison; Shelton Jane; Jena Malone; Alice Krige; Josef Sommer; Frances McDormand; Jeff Bridges
- Music by: Mason Daring
- Country of origin: United States
- Original language: English

Production
- Executive producers: Jeff Bridges; Neil Koenigsberg
- Producers: Fred Berner; David R. Ginsburg
- Cinematography: James R. Bagdonas
- Editor: Nancy Baker
- Running time: 93 minutes
- Production companies: Citadel Entertainment; The End Hunger Network; Fred Berner Films; Showtime Networks

Original release
- Network: Showtime
- Release: December 1, 1996

Hidden in America is a 1996 American television film about poverty in the United States. The film is directed by Martin Bell and stars Beau Bridges, Bruce Davison, Alice Krige, Jeff Bridges, Frances McDormand, and Jena Malone. Beau Bridges plays Bill Januson, a father struggling to support his family and whose pride and optimism prevent him from seeking help until it is too late. Bridges was nominated for multiple awards, including a Screen Actors Guild Award and an Emmy Award, while McDormand was also nominated for an Emmy Award. The film aired on December 1, 1996 on Showtime and was released to DVD on February 8, 2005.

== Plot ==
The film tells the story of the Januson family: widowed father Bill and his two children, Willa and Robbie. After working as a welder at General Motors for 17 years, a robot took over Bill's job and the family is now struggling.

Bill's daughter Willa suffers from coughing fits and headaches due to malnutrition, so Bill takes her to see their doctor and next door neighbor, Michael Millerton. Dr. Millerton says that Willa's immune system is weakening for lack of iron. He tells Bill that Willa is now at the age when any period of time without adequate nutrition can have long lasting and irreversible implications. Over time, the two families become friends. The Millertons help their neighbors in various ways, either by lending them money or giving them food. The Janusons' son, Robbie, starts skipping school to find ways to earn money. At first, he helps people bring their groceries to their car and then he walks through the park looking for cans and bottles to recycle. He meets a female mechanic named Gus with whom he develops a friendship. Gus tells Robbie, "A man's not a man unless he pulls his weight." After spending some time together, Robbie and Gus enter into a partnership with each other to fix an old car so they can sell it.

After trying and failing to find a better job, Bill goes to apply for food stamps and is told that the earliest he can receive assistance will be in five days. Later, Bill happens to walk by a construction site and, feeling desperate, he joins in and starts working. By the end of the day, the supervisor decides to hire him.

Gus tells Robbie the car needs a new carburetor. Robbie steals Bill's rent money and buys the part that he needs. The next day, Gus tells him that she found a buyer willing to pay $1,855 for the car and that she's willing to split it with him because of all the help that he has given her. Unfortunately, Gus' coworker borrows the car to see her boyfriend and ends up in a car accident. Having lost hope completely, Robbie attempts to commit suicide by hanging himself in the shower. At the hospital, Robbie confesses to his father about stealing the money. Bill is just happy to see that Robbie will be alright. The film ends on an uncertain but hopeful note as the Millerton and Januson families visit together.

== Cast ==
- Beau Bridges as Bill Januson
- Bruce Davison as Dr. Michael Millerton
- Shelton Dane as Robbie Januson
- Jena Malone as Willa Januson
- Alice Krige as Dee Millerton
- Josef Sommer as Edward Millerton
- Frances McDormand as Gus
- Jeff Bridges as Vincent
- Lisa Repo-Martell as Angela
- Pixie Bigelow as Marian Millerton
- Allegra Denton as Caroline

== Production ==
The film was shot in Toronto. It was co-produced by the End Hunger Network, an organization that dedicates itself to fighting hunger.

== Award nominations ==
Award	Category	Recipient	Result
Emmy Awards	Outstanding Lead Actor in a Miniseries or a Special	Beau Bridges	Nominated
Emmy Awards	Outstanding Supporting Actress in a Miniseries or a Special	Frances McDormand	Nominated
Emmy Awards	Outstanding Cinematography for a Miniseries or a Special	James R. Bagdonas	Nominated
Golden Globe Awards	Best Mini-Series or Motion Picture Made for TV	Hidden in America	Nominated
Satellite Awards	Best Performance by an Actor in a Mini-Series or Motion Picture Made for Television	Beau Bridges	Nominated
Satellite Awards	Best Performance by an Actress in a Mini-Series or Motion Picture Made For Television	Jena Malone	Nominated
Screen Actors Guild Awards	Outstanding Performance by a Male Actor in a TV Movie or Miniseries	Beau Bridges	Nominated
Writers Guild of America Awards	Original Long Form	Peter Silverman, Michael De Guzman	Nominated
Young Artist Awards	Best Performance in a TV Movie/Mini-Series - Young Actor	Shelton Dane	Nominated
