= Patrick J. McNulty =

American judge (1922–1997)

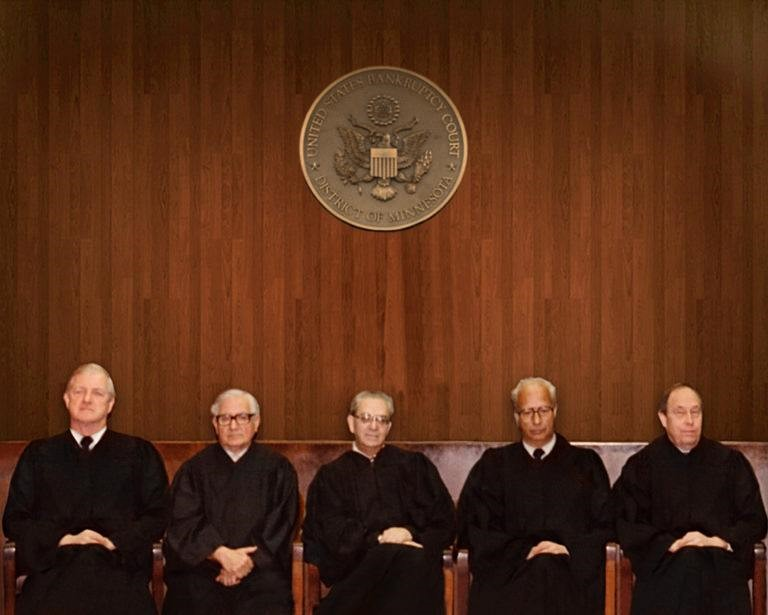
District of Minnesota, United States Bankruptcy Court judges (1970-1982), from left to right John J. Connelly, Kenneth G. Owens, Jacob Dim, Patrick J. McNulty, and Hartley Nordin.

Patrick James McNulty (May 18, 1922 – July 22, 1997) was an American judge. He served on the United States Bankruptcy Court for the District of Minnesota and the United States District Court for the District of Minnesota.

== Early life ==
McNulty was born on May 18, 1922 in L'Anse, Michigan, and grew up in Duluth, Minnesota. In 1940, he graduated from Central High School, then enrolled in St. Thomas College. Interrupting his undergradue education, McNulty was a fighter pilot with the U.S. Army Air Force during World War II, from 1943 to 1946.

McNulty received his B.S.L. from the University of Minnesota in 1948. In 1949, he graduated from the University of Minnesota Law School with a J.D., summa cum laude and Order of the Coif. While there, he was a member of the professional law fraternity Delta Theta Phi.

== Career ==
McNulty was admitted to the Minnesota Bar in 1949. He clerked for Minnesota Supreme Court Justice Frank Gallagher from 1949 to 1950 before entering practice. McNulty practiced law from 1949 to 1978 in Duluth, Minnesota.

McNulty became a part-time judge United States Bankruptcy Court for the District of Minnesota juged in 1968. McNujlty became a part-time United States magistrate judge of the United States District Court for the District of Minnesota on January 2, 1971. He also continued to serve in the United States Bankruptcy Court until 1978. He became a full-time United States magistrate judge in 1984. He retired as a magistrate judge in 1992.

McNulty was recalled to the United States District Court for the District of Minnesota on a part-time basis in April 1992. He continued to work as a special master in the District of Minnesota, but his behavior became erratic, including an arrest for shoplifting cigarettes and accusations of other shoplifting incidents.

McNulty was a member of the Minnesota Bar Association. He was the chair of the Duluth District Bar Association in 1965.

== Personal life and death ==
McNulty married to Gladys Bird LaFave of International Falls, Minnesota in the St. Jean Baptiste Chapel on August 14, 1952. They had three daughters: Pamela, Patricia, and Priscilla.

McNulty served on the board of trustees of the Marshall High School. He belonged to the Northland Country Club and was a fourth-degree member of the Duluth Knights of Columbus. He was of Roman Catholic faith and belonged to St. Michael's Church.

McNulty died on July 22, 1997, aged 75, at St. Mary's Hospital in Duluth.

== See also ==
- Federal judiciary of the United States
