= Hostile Advances =

1996 American television film by Allan Kroeker

- Also known as: Hostile Advances: The Kerry Ellison Story
- Written by: Layce Gardner
- Directed by: Allan Kroeker
- Starring: Rena Sofer; Victor Garber; Karen Allen
- Music by: Micky Erbe; Maribeth Solomon
- Country of origin: United States
- Original language: English

Production
- Executive producers: Diana Kerew; Carol Trussell
- Producers: Julian Marks; Clara George
- Cinematography: François Protat
- Editor: Jane Morrison
- Running time: 90 minutes
- Production companies: The Diana Kerew Company; Hearst Entertainment

Original release
- Network: Lifetime
- Release: May 27, 1996

Hostile Advances: The Kerry Ellison Story is a 1996 American made-for-television drama film based on Ellison v. Brady, a landmark sexual harassment case. This lawsuit set the precedent for the "reasonable woman" standard in sexual harassment law which allows for cases to be analyzed from the perspective of the complainant and not the defendant.

Starring Rena Sofer as Kerry Ellison, the film told the story from the perspective of Ellison. It was first broadcast on Lifetime Television on May 27, 1996. Although set in the US, it was filmed in Toronto, Canada, and features a largely Canadian supporting cast and production crew. The movie is directed by Canadian Allan Kroeker and written by Layce Gardner.

== Plot ==
Kerry Ellison (Rena Sofer) is a senior accountant at the Internal Revenue Service. All goes well, until Jack Gilcrest (Victor Garber) develops an interest in her. He starts stalking her—following her, and writing her sexually tense notes. Kerry makes it clear multiple times that she is not interested in him. Even when Kerry is transferred to another division, Jack's stalking does not diminish. He returns and threatens Kerry so much, she begins to get anxiety attacks. Kerry's bosses dismiss Jack's obsession as harmless, and her labor union refuses to deal with the problem.

Kerry files a sexual harassment suit against her employers, who subsequently put her through hell.

== Cast ==
- Rena Sofer as Kerry Ellison
- Victor Garber as Jack Gilcrest
- Karen Allen as Margaret
- Maria Ricossa as Liz
- Réal Andrews as Joey Westley
- Sean McCann as Mr. Ellison
- Patricia Gage as Mrs. Ellison
- David Nerman as Sam
- Bernard Behrens as Judge Gaffney
- Sherry Miller as Jean
- Richard Fitzpatrick as Hastings
- Karl Pruner as Alex
- Don Francks as Marty

== Reception ==
A review in Entertainment Weekly said, "While it plays somewhat like a cross between a sensitivity-training video and a stalker film, Advances is an interesting chronicle of a tiny step the system took to protect women from office weirdos."

== See also ==
- Sexual harassment
- Stalking
- North Country film about Jenson v. Eveleth Taconite Co., the first sexual harassment class action lawsuit
