= Williams v. Saxbe =

1976 U.S. District Court decision

Diane R. Williams
- Born: December 6, 1947
- Died: August 12, 2016 (aged 68)
- Occupation: Lawyer
- Known for: Court case Williams v. Saxbe

Williams v. Saxbe is a landmark sexual harassment case, brought by Diane R. Williams against the U.S. Department of Justice. Williams was fired from her job at the U.S. Department of Justice after refusing sexual advances from her boss. She sued in a Washington federal court and won, resulting in the first U.S. District Court ruling that quid pro quo sexual harassment constitutes sex discrimination under the Civil Rights Act of 1964. Williams was a news aide for the Washington Post in the late 1960s and also served as a reporter for the Chicago Tribune. She had a 30-year career as a lawyer.

== Biography ==
Diane R. Williams (December 6, 1947 – August 12, 2016) was a native of Washington, D.C. She graduated from Howard University in 1969 with a B.A. in English and American Literature. She was a national desk news aid for the Washington Post in the late 1960s, and joined the Washington Bureau of the Chicago Tribune in 1970 and became a Metro reporter. Williams died of cancer on August 12, 2016.

=== Williams v Saxbe ===
Diane Williams began working at the U.S Department of Justice in 1972 as a 23-year-old single mother. She worked in the Justice Department's Community Relations Service as a public information aide, where she was intimately familiar with the racial tensions of the time. Although she had previously been given several positive reviews of her work, she was dismissed from her position at the U.S Department of Justice after filing a complaint about a supervisor Harvey Brinson's unwanted sexual advances. She stated her supervisor's treatment was illegal under the Civil Rights Act of 1964, which bars employers from discriminating against workers on the basis of sex, race, religion, national origin, or color.

After she brought her complaint to the courts, U.S. District Judge Charles R. Richey ordered she receive $19,147 in compensation, ruling that the Civil Rights Act shields employees from retaliation for refusing their superior's sexual propositions. Williams v. Saxbe was decided on April 20, 1976. The term "sexual harassment" had been coined only a year earlier at Cornell University.

The case was overturned on appeal at the U.S. Court of Appeals in September 1978, after a ruling that the judge had followed improper procedures in the course of reaching his decision. The original case was affirmed on the next appeal.
