= Meritor Savings Bank v. Vinson =

- Supreme Court of the United States

Argued March 25, 1986 Decided June 19, 1986
- Full case name: Meritor Savings Bank, FSB v. Mechelle Vinson, et al.
- Citations: 477 U.S. 57 (more) 106 S. Ct. 2399; 91 L. Ed. 2d 49

Case history
- Prior: Defendants' Motion to Dismiss Granted; Vinson v. Taylor, Civil Action No. 78-1793., 1980 U.S. Dist. LEXIS 10676 (Feb. 26, 1980).; Reversed; Vinson v. Taylor753 F.2d 141 (D.C. Cir. 1985), reh'g en banc denied (May 14, 1985).; cert. granted, PSFS Sav. Bank, FSB v. Vinson, 474 U.S. 815 (1985).

Holding
- A claim of "hostile environment" sexual harassment is a form of discrimination on the basis of sex that is actionable under the Civil Rights Act of 1964.

Court membership
- Chief Justice Warren E. Burger Associate Justices William J. Brennan Jr. · Byron White; Thurgood Marshall · Harry Blackmun; Lewis F. Powell Jr. · William Rehnquist; John P. Stevens · Sandra Day O'Connor

Case opinions
- Majority: Rehnquist, joined by Burger, White, Powell, Stevens, O'Connor
- Concurrence: Stevens
- Concurrence: Marshall, joined by Brennan, Blackmun, Stevens

Laws applied
- Title VII of the Civil Rights Act of 1964

Meritor Savings Bank v. Vinson, 477 U.S. 57 (1986), is a US labor law case, where the United States Supreme Court, in a 9–0 decision, recognized sexual harassment as a violation of Title VII of the Civil Rights Act of 1964. The case was the first of its kind to reach the Supreme Court and would redefine sexual harassment in the workplace.

It established the standards for analyzing whether conduct was unlawful and when an employer would be liable. The court, for the first time, made sexual harassment an illegal form of discrimination.

== Background ==
In 1974, at the age of 19, Mechelle Vinson was hired as a teller-trainee at the northeast branch of Capitol City Federal Savings and Loan Association in Washington D.C. Vinson reported that by May 1975 her supervisor, Sidney L. Taylor, began what would be 3 years of recurring sexual harassment while in the workplace. In November 1978 Vinson was fired from her job at a Meritor Savings Bank which Taylor explained as being due to Vinson's inordinate use of sick leave. The first initiation of Vinson's civil lawsuit against Sidney L. Taylor and Capital City Federal Savings and Loan Association, which would soon change its name to Meritor Savings Bank, came in September 1978. Vinson charged that Taylor had coerced her to have sexual relations with him and made demands for sexual favors at work. Vinson stated that she had intercourse with Taylor 40 or 50 times. Additionally, she testified that Taylor had touched her in public, exposed himself to her, and forcibly raped her multiple times.

She argued such harassment created a "hostile working environment" and a form of unlawful discrimination under Title VII of the Civil Rights Act of 1964. Vinson sought injunctive relief along with compensatory and punitive damages against Taylor and the bank.

The primary question presented was whether a hostile work environment constituted a form of unlawful discrimination under the Civil Rights Act of 1964, or if the Act was limited to tangible economic discrimination in the workplace.

== Decision ==
The Court held that Title VII was "not limited to 'economic' or 'tangible' discrimination" and found that the intention of Congress was "'to strike at the entire spectrum of disparate treatment of men and women' in employment...."

The Court pointed out that guidelines issued by the EEOC specified that sexual harassment leading to noneconomic injury was a form of sex discrimination prohibited by Title VII of the Civil Rights Act of 1964. The Court recognized that the plaintiff, Mechelle Vinson, could establish violations of the Act "by proving that discrimination based on sex has created a hostile or abusive work environment." A Plaintiff with hostile environment-styled claims must prove that the challenged conduct was severe or pervasive, created a hostile or abusive working environment, was unwelcome, and was based on the plaintiff's sex.

Catharine A. MacKinnon, author of Towards a Feminist Theory of the State, was co-counsel for the respondent and wrote the respondent's brief.

== Significance ==
The ruling of Mechelle Vinson's Supreme Court case was the first instance of sexual harassment being recognized by the court as "actionable". This ruling also qualified the hostile environment which sexual harassment in the workplace creates as sex discrimination under Title VII of the Civil Rights Act of 1964. Prior to the ruling on Vinson's case, discrimination under Title VII was constituted as economic loss. This court case articulated that the creation of a hostile work environment is a form of discrimination and that economic loss is not required to be in violation of Title VII. Additionally, this case ruled that the sexual conduct between Taylor and Vinson could not be deemed voluntary due to the hierarchical relationship between supervisor and subordinates in the workplace.

Following the ruling of Meritor Savings Bank v. Vinson, reported sexual harassment cases grew from 10 cases being registered by the EEOC per year before 1986 to 624 case being reported in the subsequent following year. This number of reported cases rose to 2,217 in 1990 and then 4,626 by 1995.

A review revealed that the determination of what constitutes "severe or pervasive conduct" is invariably based on an examination of the totality of circumstances. Moreover, in gauging the totality of circumstances, lower courts typically focus on some or all of the following four factors:

1. the level of offensiveness of the unwelcome acts or words;
2. the frequency or pervasiveness of the offensive encounters;
3. the total length of time over which the encounters occurred;
4. the context in which the harassing conduct occurred. See for example Vance v. Southernbell Tel. & Tel. Co., 863 F.2d 1503 (11th Cir. 1989) (after the trial court granted a defense motion for judgment notwithstanding the verdict, on the ground that a noose hung over a black employee's desk on two different occasions was not enough, as a matter of law, to establish that the alleged racial harassment was a persistent, pervasive practice, the appellate court held that the determination of whether the defendant's conduct was sufficiently "severe and pervasive" did not turn solely on the number of incidents alleged by the plaintiff but was to be based on a consideration of all the circumstances, including the number and severity of individual incidents of harassment).

== See also ==
- US labor law
- List of United States Supreme Court cases, volume 477
- Hostile environment sexual harassment
- Hostile Advances: The Kerry Ellison Story movie about Ellison v. Brady, which set the "reasonable woman" precedent in sexual harassment law.
- Jenson v. Eveleth Taconite Co.
- Oncale v. Sundowner Offshore Services
- Crawford v. Nashville

== Sources ==
- Anderson, Katherine S. (October 1987). "Employer liability under Title VII for sexual harassment after Meritor Savings Bank v. Vinson". Columbia Law Review. 87 (6): 1258–1279. doi:10.2307/1122590. JSTOR 1122590.
- Cochran, Augustus B. (April 2004). "Sexual Harassment and the Law: The Mechelle Vinson Case". Kansas University Press: 256. Archived from the original on June 26, 2010.
- Dodier, Grace M. (1987). "Meritor Savings Bank v. Vinson: Sexual Harassment at Work". Harvard Women's Law Journal. 10: 203. ISSN 0270-1456.
- Vinciguerra, Marlisa (1989). "The Aftermath of Meritor: A Search for Standards in the Law of Sexual Harassment". Yale Law Journal. 98 (8): 1717–1738. doi:10.2307/796614. JSTOR 796614.
