= Accounting Hall of Fame =

Economics prize

The Accounting Hall of Fame is an award "recognizing accountants who are making or have made a significant contribution to the advancement of accounting" since the beginning of the 20th century. Inductees are from both accounting academia and practice. Since its inception in 1950 at Ohio State University (OSU) it has honored 124 influential accounting professors, professional practitioners, and government and business accountants from the United States and other countries.

Annual inductions to the Accounting Hall of Fame are the customary procedure. However, in some years there are no inductions, and in others multiple inductions are made.

Selection to the Accounting Hall of Fame is intended to honor and recognize distinguished service and contributions to the progress of accounting in any of its various fields. Evidence of such service includes contributions to accounting research and literature, significant service to professional accounting organizations, wide recognition as an authority in some fields of accounting, advancement of accounting education, and public service. A member must have reached a position of eminence from which the nature of his or her contributions may be established.

It is now hosted by the American Accounting Association (AAA). In 2017, OSU entered into an agreement with the American Accounting Association to transfer the authority to host the Hall of Fame to the AAA. The Accounting Hall of Fame Committee convenes the electors and administers the process to make the selections.

The induction of the 2026 members took place at the AAA Global Connect (formerly the Annual Meeting) in Las Vegas, NV.

== Overview ==
The Hall of Fame describes: "While selection to the Hall of Fame is intended to honor the people so chosen, it is also intended to be a recognition of distinguished service contributions to the progress of accounting in any of its various fields. Evidence of such service includes contributions to accounting research and literature, significant service to professional accounting organizations, wide recognition as an authority in some field of accounting, advancement of accounting education, and public service. A member must have reached a position of eminence from which the nature of his or her contributions may be judged."

"Election to The Accounting Hall of Fame is perhaps the only longstanding national award for accountants -- and probably the only international one as well -- in which both academic and practicing accountants vie for the same award."

Induction into the Accounting Hall of Fame is one of the higher honors available within accounting academia. The only comparable awards in the United States may be two awards of the American Accounting Association: the Notable Contributions to Accounting Literature Award Award which has been received by many of the Hall of Fame inductees, and the rare Seminal Contributions to Accounting Literature Award, which has only been awarded seven times. The sublist of inductees who are accounting academics, thus, includes many of the most notable accounting academics.

An accounting of 36 inductees during the first 26 years of the award identifies that 20 were chiefly active in public accounting (including 6 who were founders of major public accounting firms), 10 were university professors, 4 were government officials (including 3 chief accountants of the SEC), and that 2 were most prominent in industry.

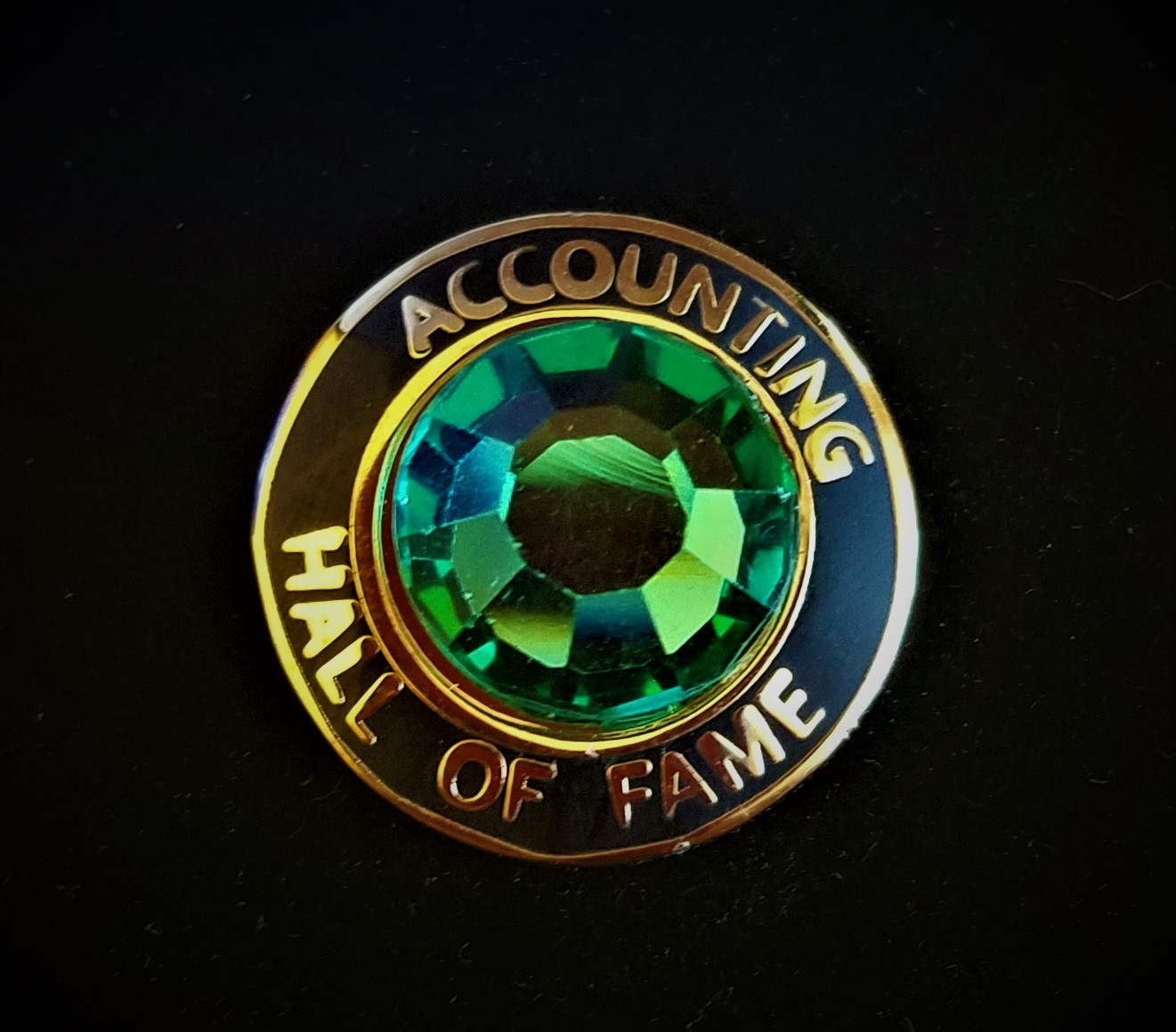
The Accounting Hall of Fame Pin

The recipients of the award are otherwise highly decorated: 21 of the first 36 are recipients of the AICPA's highest honor, its Gold Medal award; 15 received the Alpha Kappa Psi Accounting Foundation Award; at least 15 received honorary degrees, one was knighted in England; and one received "the highest honor the U.S. federal government can bestow upon a career civilian employee, the President's Award for Distinguished Federal Civilian Service."

In a keynote speech at the 50th anniversary of the Hall of Fame, hosted by the Ohio State University and the Academy of Accounting Historians, Lynn Turner, then chief accountant of the United States Securities and Exchange Commission (Washington D.C.), noted the influence of George O. May and numerous other recipients upon the evolution of accounting and auditing practice and principles "that makes our system of accounting the greatest in the world".

The award has always been intended to honor world-level contributions. The majority of recipients have been Americans, perhaps reflecting the historic leadership of America in the development of accounting regulations and in formal accounting research as much as reflecting the U.S.-based hosting of the award. Accounting standards co-evolved with the New York Stock Exchange and other public financial markets, which have a scale and history in the U.S. not matched by public markets in most other countries. Englishman Sir Arthur Lowes Dickinson was one of the earliest inductees, honored in 1951 for establishing principles of consolidated accounting for conglomerate companies such as U.S. Steel while he was senior partner of Price-Waterhouse in the U.S. from 1901 to 1913. The first Canadian inducted was Howard Irwin Ross in 1977. The first woman inducted was Katherine Schipper in 2007.

== Inductees ==
As of 2026, there are 128 inducted members of the Accounting Hall of Fame: Click the asterisk by each member's name to go to the American Accounting Association's website and learn more about them.

AHoF number	Year	Member
1	1950	May, George Oliver*
2	1950	Montgomery, Robert Hiester*
3	1950	Paton, William Andrew*
4	1951	Dickinson, Arthur Lowes*
5	1951	Hatfield, Henry Rand*
6	1952	Sells, Elijah Watt*
7	1952	Stempf, Victor Hermann*
8	1953	Andersen, Arthur Edward*
9	1953	Andrews, Thomas Coleman*
10	1953	Sprague, Charles Ezra*
11	1953	Sterrett, Joseph Edmund *
12	1954	Blough, Carman George *
13	1954	Broad, Samuel John *
14	1954	Sanders, Thomas Henry *
15	1954	Scovill, Hiram Thompson*
16	1955	Brundage, Percival Flack*
17	1956	Littleton, Ananias Charles*
18	1957	Kester, Roy Bernard*
19	1957	Miller, Hermann Clinton*
20	1958	Finney, Harry Anson *
21	1958	Foye, Arthur Bevins *
22	1958	Perry, Donald Putnam *
23	1959	Eaton, Marquis George *
24	1960	Stans, Maurice Hubert*
25	1961	Kohler, Eric Louis *
26	1963	Barr, Andrew *
27	1963	Morey, Lloyd *
28	1964	Grady, Paul Franklin *
29	1964	Mason, Perry Empey *
30	1965	Peirce, James Loring *
31	1968	Bailey, George Davis *
32	1968	Carey, John Lansing *
33	1968	Werntz, William Welling *
34	1974	Trueblood, Robert Martin *
35	1975	Spacek, Leonard Paul *
36	1976	Queenan, John William *
37	1977	Ross, Howard Irwin *
38	1978	Mautz, Robert Kuhn *
39	1979	Moonitz, Maurice *
40	1980	Armstrong, Marshall Smith *
41	1981	Staats, Elmer Boyd *
42	1982	Miller, Herbert Elmer *
43	1983	Davidson, Sidney *
44	1984	Benson, Henry Alexander *
45	1985	Gellein, Oscar Strand *
46	1986	Anthony, Robert Newton *
47	1987	Defliese, Philip Leroy *
48	1988	Bedford, Norton Moore *
49	1989	Ijiri, Yuji *
50	1990	Horngren, Charles Thomas *
51	1991	Chambers, Raymond John *
52	1992	Solomons, David *
53	1993	Baker, Richard Thomas *
54	1994	Sprouse, Robert Thomas *
55	1995	Cooper, William Wager *
56	1996	Beaver, William Henry *
57	1996	Bowsher, Charles Arthur *
58	1996	Kirk, Donald James *
59	1997	Burns, Thomas Junior *
60	1997	Burton, John Campbell *
61	1998	Wyatt, Arthur Ramer *
62	1999	Cook, Jay Michael *
63	1999	Groves, Ray John *
64	2000	Demski, Joel Stanley *
65	2000	Haskins, Charles Waldo *
66	2000	O'Malley, Shaun Fenton *
67	2000	Skinner, Ross Macgregor *
68	2001	Dopuch, Nicholas *
69	2001	Edwards, James Don *
70	2002	Zeff, Stephen Addam *
71	2003	Edwards, Edgar O. *
72	2003	Bell, Philip W. *
73	2003	Leisenring, James J. *
74	2004	Beresford, Dennis Robert *
75	2004	Feltham, Gerald Albert *
76	2004	Vatter, William Joseph *
77	2005	Baxter, William Threipland *
78	2005	Jenkins, Edmund Lowell *
79	2006	Kaplan, Robert Samuel *
80	2006	Sterling, Robert Raymond *
81	2007	Schipper, Katherine *
82	2008	Hopwood, Anthony *
83	2008	Schuetze, Walter P. *
84	2009	Dyckman, Thomas *
85	2009	Ball, Raymond John *
86	2010	Walker, David Michael *
87	2011	Previts, Gary John *
88	2011	Storey, Reed Karl *
89	2012	Herz, Robert *
90	2013	Tweedie, David Philip *
91	2014	Kinney, William Rudolph *
92	2014	Briloff, Abraham Jacob *
93	2015	Ohlson, James A. *
94	2018	Anderson, George David *
95	2018	Barth, Mary Elizabeth *
96	2018	Kirtley, Olivia Faulkner *
97	2018	Stringer, Kenneth Wilson *
98	2019	Campfield, William Louis *
99	2019	Nicholson, J. Lee *
100	2019	Palmrose, Zoe-Vonna *
101	2019	Penman, Stephan Harland *
102	2020	Brink, Victor Zinn *
103	2020	Mednick, Robert *
104	2020	Seidman, Leslie French *
105	2020	Sunder, Shyam *
106	2020	Williams, Doyle Zane *
107	2021	Carter, Arthur Hazelton *
108	2021	Larcker, David Francis *
109	2021	Mobley, Sybil Collins *
110	2021	Noski, Charles Howard *
111	2022	Brown, Frank Donaldson *
112	2022	Bunting, Robert Louis *
113	2022	Verrecchia, Robert Ernest *
114	2023	Elliott, Robert Kalb *
115	2023	Lybrand, William Mitchell *
116	2023	Peters, Aulana Louise *
117	2023	Wilson, Gordon Peter *
118	2024	Libby, Robert (Bob) *
119	2024	Ross, Frank Kenneth *
120	2024	Watts, Ross Leslie *
121	2025	Bean, David Richard *
122	2025	Melancon, Barry Clay *
123	2025	Shevlin, Terry James *
124	2025	Washington Wylie, Mary Thelma *
125	2026	Dodaro, Eugene (Gene) Louis *
126	2026	Goezler, Daniel Lee *
127	2026	Mattessich, Richard Victor Alvarus *
128	2026	McCarthy, William Ernest *
