= Joel S. Demski =

American accounting researcher and educator

Joel Demski
- Born: 1940 (age 85–86)
- Education: University of Michigan; University of Chicago
- Scientific career
- Fields: Accounting
- Workplaces: University of Florida; Yale University

Joel S. Demski (born 1940) is an American accounting researcher and educator, and Frederick E. Fisher Eminent Scholar at University of Florida, inducted to the Accounting Hall of Fame in 2000.

== Life and work ==
Born in Sturgis, Michigan to George and Athalia Demski, Demski moved with his family to Pinconning, Michigan, where he grew up and his father had his own machine shop. He received a BSE in industrial engineering in 1962 from the University of Michigan, and MBA degree with high distinction in 1963. In this MBA program he encountered William A. Paton and took courses from Stephen A. Zeff and Samuel R. Hepworth. In 1967 he obtained his PhD from the University of Chicago.

After graduation Demski started his academic career in 1967 at the Columbia University. The next year in 1968 he moved to Stanford University, where he was appointed Professor of Accountancy. In 1985 he was appointed Professor of Information and Accounting Systems at the Yale University, and in 1994 Scholar in Accounting at the University of Florida. Demski is a past president of the American Accounting Association.

In 1986 Demski received the Outstanding Accounting Educator Award of the American Accounting Association in 1986. And in 1994, along with co-author Gerald A. Feltham, he was awarded the Seminal Contributions in Accounting Literature Award for their article "Economic Incentives in Budgetary Control Systems" published in The Accounting Review in April, 1978.

== Reception ==
In 2000, Demski was one of three inductees to the Accounting Hall of Fame, a program hosted by Ohio State University which honors top academics and practitioners nation- and world-wide. An excerpt from the Hall of Fame biography comments on his research contributions:

His pathbreaking work on applications of information economics and agency theory to accounting is presented in 60 published journal articles, 5 books, and over 25 other published papers. His work and that of the countless students he inspired has created a new domain for accounting theory. He is one of the most widely cited authors in the accounting literature and many of his papers have been awarded national prizes for their importance and influence. One of his first papers, "An Accounting System Structured on a Linear Programming Model," won the 1967 AICPA Award for Outstanding Contributions to the Accounting Literature and 3 years later, another paper, "The Use of Models in Information Evaluation" (written with his former colleague Gerald Feltham), captured the same award.

== Selected publications ==
Demski is author of numerous articles and of books including:

- Demski, Joel S., and Gerald A. Feltham. Cost determination: A conceptual approach. Ames, IA: Iowa State University Press, 1976.
- Demski, Joel S. Information analysis. Addison-Wesley Publishing Company, 1980.
- Demski, Joel S. Managerial uses of accounting information. Springer, 1994; Second Edition, 2008.

Articles, a selection:

- Demski, Joel S., and Gerald A. Feltham. "Economic incentives in budgetary control systems." Accounting Review (1978): 336-359.
- Baiman, Stanley, and Joel S. Demski. "Economically optimal performance evaluation and control systems." Journal of Accounting Research (1980): 184-220.
- Demski, Joel S., and David Sappington. "Optimal incentive contracts with multiple agents." Journal of Economic Theory 33.1 (1984): 152-171.
