= Beta Alpha Psi =

International accounting honor society

- ΒΑΨ
- Founded: February 12, 1919; 107 years ago University of Illinois at Urbana-Champaign
- Type: Professional
- Affiliation: Independent
- Former affiliation: PIC
- Status: Active
- Emphasis: Business and Data Analytics
- Scope: International
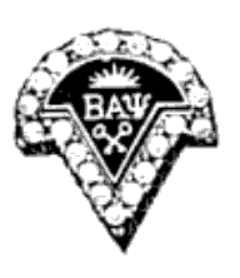
- Member badge
- Colors: Crimson and Black
- Chapters: 342
- Colonies: 12
- Members: 300,000+ lifetime
- Nickname: BAP
- Headquarters: c/o American Accounting Association; 900 Town Center Parkway; Lakewood Ranch, Florida 34202; United States
- Website: bap.org

Beta Alpha Psi (ΒΑΨ) is an international honor society for accounting, finance and information systems students attending universities accredited by the Association to Advance Collegiate Schools of Business or the European Quality Improvement System.

It was founded on February 12, 1919, at the University of Illinois at Urbana-Champaign. It is headquartered in Lakewood Ranch, Florida. The organization has over 300 chapters on college and university campuses with over 300,000 members worldwide.

== Objectives ==
Beta Alpha Psi encourages and recognizes scholastic and professional excellence in the business information field, promotes the study and practice of accounting, finance, and information systems, and provides opportunities for self-development, service and association among members and practicing professionals. It "strives to encourage a sense of ethical, social, and public responsibility". The organization also promotes the development of technical and professional skills that are used to complement the university education, philanthropic activities, and interaction between students, faculty, and professionals. Beta Alpha Psi's objectives are accomplished through the activities of each chapter respectively. Each chapter receives financial funding for these activities through the sponsorship of various public and private firms.

== History ==
On April 17, 1896, the New York legislature established the Certified Public Accountant (CPA) designation. This designation in business encouraged a greater focus on accounting and commerce knowledge, and Beta Alpha Psi was formed in 1919 to promote the CPA rank on college campuses. Two years after its founding, all of the existing U.S. states had adopted CPA regulations.

Beta Alpha Psi's beginnings relate to Hiram Scovill, an accounting professor at the University of Illinois. Several new honor societies and professional fraternities that had formed a few years before Scovill's return introduced students to the benefits of professional organizations.

Scovill and professor A. C. Littleton formed an accounting club on campus in 1917. Beta Alpha Psi emerged two years later. The first members were six students from Professor Scovill's CPA course. The organization was founded on the principles of scholarship, practicality, and sociability, and its initial objective was to stimulate cooperation and interest in accounting. One of its main purposes was to encourage and foster service as the basis of the accounting profession and to secure the highest ethical ideals in the practice of accountancy. Eleven students were initiated as members on February 12, 1919; Scovill served as the organization's president.

In the original constitution for the University of Illinois chapter, the initiation fee was $10 and dues were an additional $2 per semester. Any member who was absent from a function without first being excused was charged 25 cents. Section I, Article IV, of the original constitution, stated that any male person who was registered in third-year accounting, who contemplated a continuance in accounting work, and who had a junior class standing as shown by his college records was eligible for membership in the organization.

Nine of the eleven members became CPAs. By 1939, only one of the original eleven members, the first president Russell Morrison, was a practicing CPA. Morrison was actively involved in the American Accounting Association. In 1964, he, along with eight other leading accounting professors, was selected to serve on the "Committee to Prepare a Statement of Basic Accounting Theory", which provided major contributions to American accounting thought. In February 1921, Beta Alpha Psi officially became a national organization after it adopted a national constitution. Less than nine years later, the organization boasted 900 members, and on November 8, 1950, Jeannie Skelton, the first female member of Beta Alpha Psi, was inducted into the Miami University (Ohio) chapter.

Beta Alpha Psi's logo consists of three different aspects: the emblem, the rising sun, and the crossed keys. The emblem is used to promote the promise of careers for financial information professionals. The rising sun represents the professionals who continuously rise higher. The crossed keys symbolize the knowledge Beta Alpha Psi provides that will unlock the doors for the financial world. Together these three aspects represent what Beta Alpha Psi is about. The Greek letters Beta Alpha Psi represent scholarship, social responsibility, and practicality respectively.

=== International presence ===
Beta Alpha Psi continues to grow as new chapters are installed internationally. Outside the United States, local chapters operate in Australia, New Zealand and Saudi Arabia.

== Governance ==
Beta Alpha Psi is governed by a constitution and by-laws. It is managed by the Board of Directors, which consists of thirteen financial information professionals or professors of accounting, finance, or information systems, the Professional Partners chair, and two alumni representatives. The alumni representatives are recent graduates who were active in their Beta Alpha Psi chapters.

Beta Alpha Psi's Professional Partners consists of prominent professional accountants who are active in public accounting, industry, and government. Members serve three-year terms. The Partners provide the Board of Directors independent, external advice on and assistance in the organization's routine operations and special projects.

The International Chapter comprises all faculty advisors, student presidents, and past and present members of Beta Alpha Psi. This body holds a meeting every year and provides advice and assistance to the Board of Directors. Local chapters are composed of the students and the faculty members at each university. Students guide each chapter's activities while faculty advisors mentor the chapters and provide a liaison between the members and other faculty. But different local chapters operate in diverse ways. While some chapters are organized as accounting honor societies or others operate as financial information fraternities.

== Membership ==
To become a part of Beta Alpha Psi, students must be invited to join by the local chapter at the university they attend, and they are required to meet various requirements. The minimum requirements for eligibility to be elected as a pledge, though a chapter can set stricter requirements, include:

- Declare an academic major in accounting, finance, or information systems
- Pay an annual membership fee
- Complete at least one year of courses at the collegiate level (30 semester hours or equivalent)
- Maintain a grade point average of 3.5 (where an A is equal to a 4.0)

A separate set of requirements is set for election to membership, including:

- Declare an academic major in accounting, finance, or information systems (or have stated an intention to declare a concentration in accounting, finance, or information systems)
- Complete two years of collegiate courses and at least one upper-level course beyond the business core (for transfer students, the most recent qualifying course must be at an institution accredited by the Association to Advance Collegiate Schools of Business- or European Quality Improvement System
- Maintain a cumulative grade point average of 3.0 in upper-level courses of their declared major beyond the business core; and
  - Maintain a 3.0 cumulative grade point average, or
  - Rank within the top 35% of their university class, or
  - Attain a 3.25 cumulative grade point average on the most recently completed 30 semester hours

== Notable members ==
- Arthur E. Andersen, founder of accounting firm Arthur Andersen
- T. Coleman Andrews, Commissioner of Internal Revenue 1953–1955; 1956 independent candidate for President of the United States
- Yuji Ijiri, president of the American Accounting Association and inductee into the Accounting Hall of Fame
- Eugene Lee, sports agent representing players in the National Football League
- William Andrew Paton, founder of the American Accounting Association and The Accounting Review
- Mary Ann Tobin, former Kentucky Auditor of Public Accounts
