= Charles Bowsher =

American businessman and politician (1931–2022)

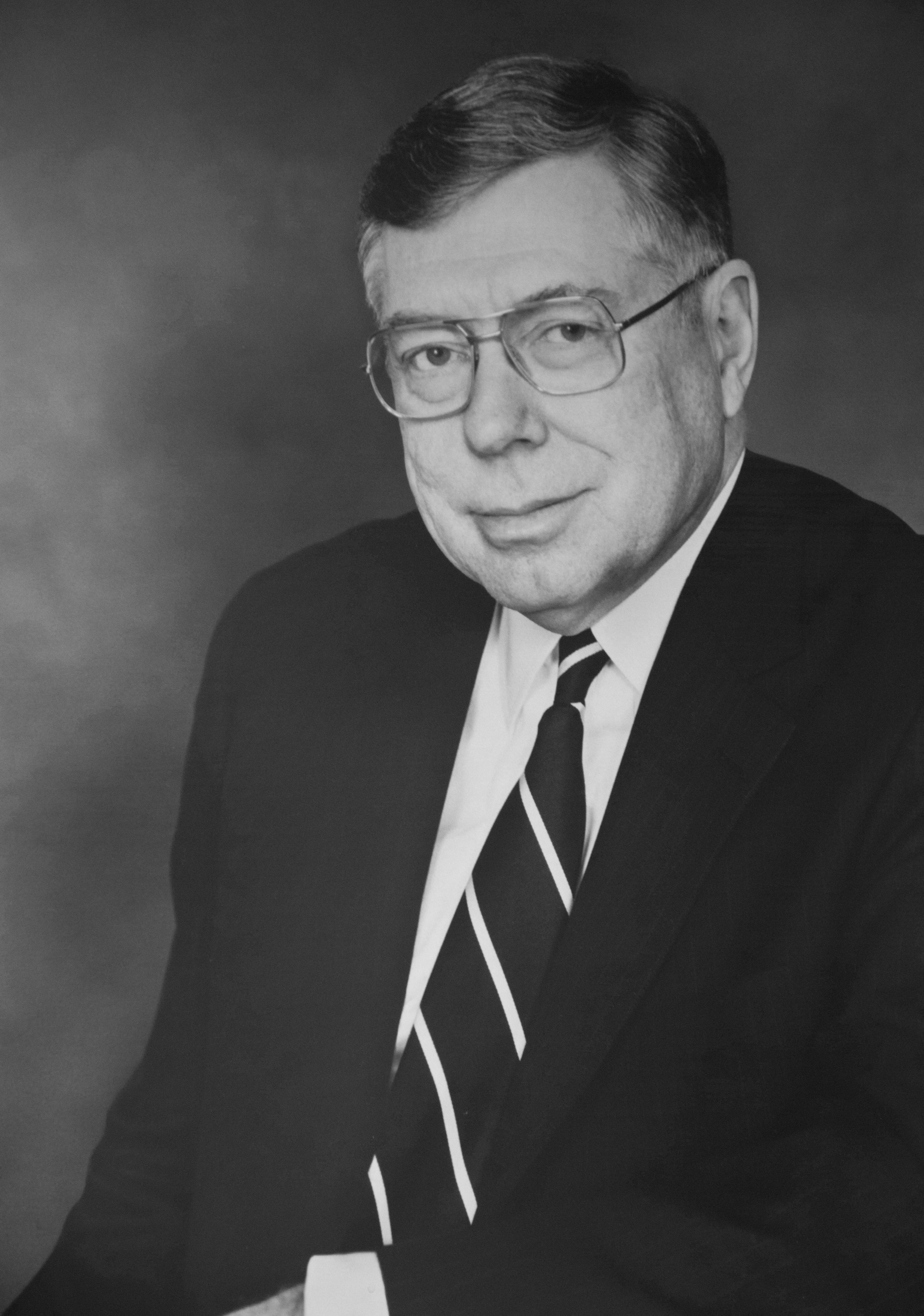

6th Comptroller General of the United States
- In office October 6, 1981 – September 30, 1996
- President: Ronald Reagan; George H. W. Bush; Bill Clinton
- Preceded by: Elmer B. Staats
- Succeeded by: David M. Walker

5th Assistant Secretary of the Navy (Financial Management and Comptroller)
- In office December 18, 1967 – June 30, 1971
- President: Lyndon B. Johnson
- Preceded by: Charles F. Baird
- Succeeded by: Frank P. Sanders

Personal details
- Born: Charles Arthur Bowsher; May 30, 1931 Elkhart, Indiana, U.S.
- Died: September 30, 2022 (aged 91) Bethesda, Maryland, U.S.
- Education: University of Illinois at Urbana–Champaign; University of Chicago (MBA)
- Occupation: Businessman, accountant
- Military career
- Branch: United States Army
- Service years: 1950–1952
- Rank: Staff sergeant
- Conflicts: Korean War

Charles Arthur Bowsher (May 30, 1931 – September 30, 2022) was an American businessman and politician. He served as the 6th comptroller general of the United States from 1981 to 1996. During that period, he led the General Accounting Office in addressing the savings and loan crisis and other major issues. He also served as the 5th assistant secretary of the Navy (financial management and comptroller) during the Lyndon B. Johnson administration from 1967 to 1971.

== Early life ==
Bowsher was born in Elkhart, Indiana, on May 30, 1931. His father worked as an engineer for the New York Central Railroad. Bowsher attended public schools in his hometown and in Chicago. He studied accounting at the University of Illinois at Urbana–Champaign, graduating with a bachelor's degree in 1953. He then joined the United States Army and served for two years, before obtaining a Master of Business Administration from the University of Chicago School of Business in 1956.

== Career ==
After graduating, Bowsher first worked for Arthur Andersen & Co. starting in 1956. While at the firm, he played a crucial role in its efforts to encourage public discussion on the need for sound financial reporting within the public sector. From 1967 to 1971, Bowsher served as Assistant Secretary of the Navy (Financial Management and Comptroller). He oversaw a budget of over $20 billion a year, 4,500 staff in the accounting department, and 500 individuals in internal audit. He went back to Arthur Andersen after four years in the role and assumed an executive position. He was also responsible for looking after the firm's work for various federal agencies, such as the Department of the Interior, the Agency for International Development, and the Federal Reserve.

=== Comptroller General ===
Bowsher was nominated to serve as United States Comptroller General by President Ronald Reagan in July 1981, succeeding Elmer B. Staats. During his tenure, he was subject of the lawsuit Bowsher v. Synar, which led to the U.S. Supreme Court striking down the Gramm-Rudman-Hollings Act of 1986. He was known for his visible role during the savings and loan crisis when he addressed the General Accounting Office. He was especially critical of manoeuvres by the US Congress to reduce oversight of the savings and loans industry, stating that "this is a huge scandal and to a large extent it was allowed to grow because of the way this town does business".

Bowsher was instrumental in Congress' passage of the Single Audit Act of 1984, which required annual audits for state and local governments. He also played a key role in the passing of the Chief Financial Officers' Act of 1990, requiring federal department and agencies to prepare financial statements and undergo annual financial audits.

== Later life ==
Bowsher was inducted into the Accounting Hall of Fame in 1996, along with William Henry Beaver and Donald James Kirk.

Bowsher later served as the Secretary-Treasurer/Budget Chairman for the Board of Directors of the Concord Coalition. He also served on the board of directors of the Committee for a Responsible Federal Budget.

== Personal life ==
Bowsher married Mary Mahoney in 1963. They met while he was working for Arthur Andersen, and they remained married for 59 years until his death. Together, they had two children.

Bowsher died on September 30, 2022, at home in Bethesda, Maryland. He was 91 years old.

Government offices
Preceded by Charles F. Baird	Assistant Secretary of the Navy (Financial Management and Comptroller); August 2, 1971 – May 5, 1972	Succeeded by Frank P. Sanders
