= Richard Mattessich =

Austrian-Canadian business economist (1922–2019)

Richard Victor Alvarus Mattessich (August 9, 1922 – September 30, 2019) was an Austrian-Canadian business economist and Emeritus Professor of Accounting at the University of British Columbia, known for introducing the concept of electronic spreadsheets into the field of business accounting in 1961, as well as pioneering analytical and philosophical methods in accounting.

== Life and work ==
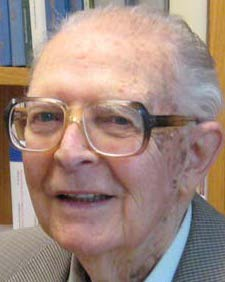

Born in Trieste, Mattessich obtained his degree in Mechanical Engineering in 1940 at the Engineering College, Vienna IV, his MBA in 1944 at the Vienna School of Economics and Business Administration, where in 1945 he also obtained his Dr. rer. pol. in Economics.

After his graduation Mattessich in 1945 started as research associate at the Austrian Institute of Economic Research in Vienna. In 1947 he moved to the Rosenberg Institute of St. Gallen, where he was appointed Instructor of Commerce. In 1952 he moved to Canada and was Department Head of Commerce from 1953 to 1959 at the Mount Allison University. From 1959 to 1967 he was Associate Professor of Accounting at the University of California, Berkeley, and from 1967 to 1987 Professor of Accounting at the University of British Columbia, and since 1988 emeritus professor.

Mattessich was awarded honorary doctoral degrees from the University of Madrid (Complutense) in 1998, the University of Málaga, Spain in 2006; from the University of Montesquieu in Bordeaux in 2006; and from the University of Graz in Austria in 2007. He died in September 2019 at the age of 97.

== Work ==
=== Simulation of the Firm, 1964 ===
In 1964 Mattessich published "Simulation of the Firm Through a Budget Computer Program." This book anticipated, by almost twenty years, major elements of such bestselling microcomputer programmes as VisiCalc, SuperCalc, Lotus 1-2-3, etc.

Murphy (1997) acknowledged that this work "foreshadows the basic principles behind today's computer spreadsheets: the use of matrices, (budget) simulation, and, most important, the calculations that support each matrix cell."

=== General Theory of Accounting, 1972 ===
Mattessich's 1972 article "Methodological Preconditions and Problems of a General Theory of Accounting", published in The Accounting Review, received the international Award for Notable Contribution to Accounting Literature of the American Institute of Certified Public Accountants in Cooperation with the American Accounting Association.

=== Two-hundred Years of Accounting Research, 2009 ===
In the 2009 publication "Two-hundred Years of Accounting Research: An International Survey of Personalities, Ideas, and Publications from about 1800 to 2000," Mattessich summarized the development of accounting and accounting research in over 20 countries since early 19th century. Mattessich specified:

Its main emphasis is on accounting research in the English, German, Italian, French and Spanish language areas; it also contains chapters dealing with research in Finland, the Netherlands, Scandinavia, Russia, Poland and the Ukraine as well as Argentina and Japan. A separate chapter summarizes research activity in the rest of the globe from Eastern Europe to Israel, the Arab and African countries as well as India, China and other countries of the Far East.

And furthermore its "focus is not on the history of accounting, but on the history of its research and the publications underlying it (though, wherever necessary, accounting facts beyond research were taken into consideration)... A major goal was to offer a broad overview, covering the pertinent publications of an international spectrum, as wide as possible, under the given limitations."

== Selected publications ==
- Mattessich, Richard. Simulation of the Firm Through a Budget Computer Program. Homewood, Illinois: R.D. Irwin, Inc., 1964,
- Mattessich, Richard. Accounting and Analytical Methods: Measurement and Projection of Income and Wealth in the Micro- and Macro-Economy. Scholars Book Company, 1977.
- Mattessich, Richard. Instrumental Reasoning and Systems Methodology: An Epistemology of the Applied and Social Sciences. No. 15. Springer Science & Business Media, 1978.
- Mattessich, Richard. Critique of Accounting: Examination of the Foundations and Normative Structure of an Applied Discipline. Praeger Pub Text, 1995.
- Mattessich, Richard. The Beginnings of Accounting and Accounting Thought: Accounting Practice in the Middle East (8000 BC to 2000 BC) and Accounting Thought in India (300 BC and the Middle Ages). Taylor & Francis, 2000.
- Mattessich, Richard. Two Hundred Years of Accounting Research. 2009.
- Mattessich, Richard, Accounting and Philosophy: Epistemological Explorations in the Economic and Social Sciences, Routledge. 2014.

Articles, a selection:

- Mattessich, Richard V. "Towards a General and Axiomatic Foundation of Accountancy – with an Introduction to the Matrix Formulation of Accounting Systems", Accounting Research 8 (4 (October 1957), pp. 328–355, (London, UK., precursor of Accounting and Business Research).
- Mattessich, Richard V. "Budgeting Models and System Simulation," The Accounting Review 36 (July 1961), pp. 384–397.
- Mattessich, Richard V. "Methodological Preconditions and Problems of a General Theory of Accounting", The Accounting Review 47 (July 1972), pp. ADVANCE \U 0.0469-487
- Mattessich, Richard V. "Fritz Schmidt (1882–1950) and his Pioneering Work of Current Value Accounting in Comparison to Edwards and Bell's Theory*." Contemporary Accounting Research 2.2 (1986): 157-178.
- Mattessich, Richard V. "Commentary: Accounting Schism or Synthesis? A Challenge for the Conditional‐Normative Approach*." Canadian Accounting Perspectives 1.2 (2002): 185-216.
- Mattessich, Richard V. "FASB and Social Reality-An Alternate Realist View." Accounting and the Public Interest 9.1 (2009): 39-64.
