= Carman =

In Celtic mythology, Carman (Carmán) or Carmun was a warrior and sorceress from Athens who tried to invade Ireland in the days of the Tuatha Dé Danann, along with her three sons, Dub ("darkness"), Dother ("evil") and Dian ("violence"). She used her magical powers to destroy all the fruit of Ireland.

Four of the Tuatha Dé Danann, Crichinbel, Lug, Bé Chuille and Aoi, challenged Carman and her sons. The sons were forced to leave Ireland, and Carman was imprisoned. She died of longing and was buried in Wexford among oak trees. Her grave was dug by Bres. The place she was buried was called Carman after her, and the Tuatha Dé Danann are said to have instituted an Óenach Carmán, or Festival of Carmán.

Celtic historian Peter Berresford Ellis describes her as "a goddess who came to Ireland from Athens with her three ferocious sons – Calma (Valiant), Dubh (Black) and Olc (Evil). They laid Ireland to waste but were eventually overcome by the Tuatha Dé Danann. Carmán died of grief and it is recorded that death 'came upon her in an ungentle shape'. She was subsequently remembered in Leinster by a Festival of Carmán held at Lughnasad, 1 August."

Her story is told in a poem of the Metrical Dindshenchas, which states that she died in 600 BCE.

== Given name ==
- Carman Barnes (1912–1980), American novelist
- Carman George Blough (1895–1981), American accountant
- Carman Lapointe (born 1951), Canadian diplomat
- Carman Lee (born 1966), Hong Kong actress
- Carman Maxwell (1902–1987), American animator
- Carman McClelland (1951–2022), Canadian politician
- Carman Miller (born 1940), Canadian military historian
- Carman A. Newcomb (1830–1902), American politician
- Carman Newsome (1912–1974), American actor
- Carmelo Domenic Licciardello known as Carman (1956–2021), American singer
- John Carman Ramsden, Canadian politician
