= Charles Thomas Horngren =

American accounting scholar

Charles Thomas Horngren (October 28, 1926 – October 23, 2011) was an American accounting scholar and professor of accounting at Stanford University, known for his work in "pioneering modern-day management accounting."

== Biography ==
Born in Milwaukee, Horngren joined the U.S. Army after high school graduation in 1946. Back in Milwaukee, he obtained his BA in accounting at the Marquette University in 1949. In 1952 he obtained his MBA from Harvard Business School, and in 1955 his PhD from University of Chicago.

After his Marquette University graduation, Horngren had started his career as accountant, and started lecturing accounting at a business college. In 1952 he joined the University of Chicago faculty as lecturer. After his doctorate graduation he taught at Marquette University and at University of Wisconsin–Milwaukee, and returned to the University of Chicago as Professor of Accounting. In 1966 he moved to the Stanford Graduate School of Business, where he spent the rest of his academic career.

Inspired by the work of William J. Vatter, Horngren published the influential textbook Cost Accounting: A Managerial Emphasis, in 1962. This was the first of a number of books on financial and cost accounting Horngren co-authored, which shaped the theory of modern-day management accounting. Horngren was inducted into the Accounting Hall of Fame in 1990.

== Selected publications ==
- Horngren, C. T., Sundem, G. L., Peyvandi, A. A., Robertson, W. D., & Fisher, A. (1990). Introduction to management accounting. Englewood Cliffs, NJ: Prentice-Hall.
- Horngren, Charles T., Gary L. Sundem, and William O. Stratton. Introduction to management accounting. (1996).
- Horngren, Charles T., Alnoor Bhimani, Srikant M. Datar, and George Foster. Management and cost accounting. Harlow: Financial Times/Prentice Hall, 2002/2008.
- Horngren, C. T., Harrison, W. T., Bamber, L. S., Willis, B., & Jones, B. (2005). Accounting. Pearson Education.
- Harrison, Walter T., and Charles T. Horngren. Financial accounting. Pearson Education, 2008.

Articles, a selection:

- Horngren, Charles T. "Marketing of accounting standards." Journal of Accountancy 136.4 (1973): 61-66.
- Kaplan, Robert S., Shank, J. K., Horngren, C. T., Boer, G., Ferrara, W. L., & Robinson, M. A. (1990). "Contribution margin analysis: no longer relevant/strategic cost management: the new paradigm." Journal of management accounting research, 2(1), 1-32.
