= Blough =

Blough may refer to:

== Places ==
- Blough, Pennsylvania, a community in Somerset County, Pennsylvania

== People with the surname ==
- Carman George Blough (1895–1981), American accountant
- David Blough (born 1995), American football player and coach
- Roger Blough (1904–1985), the former chairman and chief executive of the United States Steel Corporation
