= Philip Bell =

Philip Bell may refer to:

- Philip Bell (colonial administrator) (1590–1678)
- Philip Alexander Bell (1808–1889), American newspaper editor
- Philip Ingress Bell (1900–1986), British barrister and judge
- Philip W. Bell (1924–2007), American accounting professor
