= Zoe-Vonna Palmrose =

American accountant and academic

Academic background
- Education: Oregon State University (BS); University of Washington (MBA, PhD)
- Thesis: Quality-differentiation, surrogates, and the pricing of audit services: an empirical investigation (1982)

Academic work
- Discipline: Accountant
- Sub-discipline: Financial reporting; Auditing
- Institutions: University of California, Berkeley; University of Washington

Zoe-Vonna Palmrose is a Professor Emeritus of Accounting at the University of Southern California Marshall School of Business and faculty at the Foster School of Business at the University of Washington. In 2019, Palmrose was selected for the American Accounting Association's Accounting Hall of Fame. According to the AAA's biography, Palmrose "has published and spoken extensively on a variety of issues related to the quality of financial reporting and auditing" and she "is recognized as an expert in translating the complexities and jargon of accounting into plain English for general audiences."

== Early life and education ==
Palmrose was raised in Astoria, Oregon. She was one of eight children. Her father was a doctor and her mother was a nurse. Palmrose began her formal accounting education in an accounting course at a community college after working as a bank teller during college.

Palmrose completed a B.S. at Oregon State University in 1968, an MBA at the University of Washington in 1978 and a PhD at the University of Washington in 1982.

== Career ==
Palmrose worked for Haskins & Sells in Portland, Oregon from 1968 to 1970. While Palmrose worked as a CPA in Portland, she began teaching an accounting class in the evening at Portland State University in 1969. From 1970 to 1973, she worked for the CPA firm Yergen and Meyer in Astoria, Oregon, and as the Assistant Controller at the University of Puget Sound in Tacoma, Washington from 1973 to 1974. She also worked at Haskins & Sells in Seattle, Washington in 1974.

From 1975 to 1978, Palmrose worked at Mathematical Sciences Northwest, Inc. in Bellevue, Washington, as an assistant to the vice president of administration. She was also a lecturer at the Seattle Campus of the University of Puget Sound from 1975 to 1982, and then an Assistant Professor at the University of California, Berkeley from 1982 to 1989. In 1989, she joined the faculty of the University of Southern California as an Associate Professor, became a Professor in 1995, and then an Accounting Circle Professor Emerita of Accounting in 2011.

From 2000 to 2006, Palmrose also worked as a consultant for accounting, auditing practice, and public policy. In 2006, Palmrose took a two-year leave of absence from her position as the PricewaterhouseCoopers Professor of Auditing at the University of Southern California Leventhal School of Accounting and Marshall School of Business to work as the Deputy Chief Accountant for Professional Practice at the U.S. Securities and Exchange Commission.

In 2011, Palmrose joined the faculty at the University of Washington.

== Selected works ==
=== Books ===
- Thog's Guide to Quantum Economics: 50000 Years of Accounting Basics for the Future

=== Articles ===
- Palmrose, Zoe-Vonna (1 March 2009). "Science, Politics, and Accounting: A View from the Potomac". The Accounting Review. 84 (2): 281–297. doi:10.2308/accr.2009.84.2.281.
- Nelson, Mark W.; Smith, Steven D.; Palmrose, Zoe-Vonna (2005). "The Effect of Quantitative Materiality Approach on Auditors' Adjustment Decisions". The Accounting Review. 80 (3): 897–920. doi:10.2308/accr.2005.80.3.897. JSTOR 4093181.
- Kinney, William R.; Palmrose, Zoe-Vonna; Scholz, Susan (June 2004). "Auditor Independence, Non-Audit Services, and Restatements: Was the U.S. Government Right?". Journal of Accounting Research. 42 (3): 561–588. doi:10.1111/j.1475-679X.2004.t01-1-00141.x.
- Palmrose, Zoe-Vonna; Richardson, Vernon J.; Scholz, Susan (February 2004). "Determinants of market reactions to restatement announcements". Journal of Accounting and Economics. 37 (1): 59–89. doi:10.1016/j.jacceco.2003.06.003.
- Palmrose, Zoe-Vonna (30 April 2002). "Auditors' New Procedures for Detecting Fraud". Journal of Accountancy: 63–66.

== Honors and awards ==
- In 2008, Palmrose was nominated by American Accounting Association for Presidential Scholar. Following the same year in June, she was nominated by Named one of Treasury and Risk Magazine’s 100 Most Influential People in Finance.
- In 2006, Palmrose was awarded the Dean's Award Research Excellence from American Accounting Association/Deloitte Wildman Medal.
- In 2003, Palmrose was awarded the American Accounting Association/Deloitte Wildman Medal, as well as the Auditing Section’s Distinguished Service Award
- In 1988, she won an award from California Society of CPAs Accounting Faculty Fellow Award.
