= Henry Hatfield =

Henry Hatfield may refer to:

- Henry D. Hatfield (1875–1962), American politician in West Virginia
- Henry Rand Hatfield (1866–1945), American accountant and pioneer in accounting education
