= Eric Kohler =

Eric Louis Kohler (1892–1976) was an American accountant, the author of a widely used dictionary of accounting.

== Life and work ==
Kohler was born on July 9, 1892, in Owosso, Michigan. He did his undergraduate studies at the University of Michigan, graduating in 1914, and went on to earn a master's degree from Northwestern University. He then worked at Arthur Andersen from 1915 to 1920 (interrupted by a stint in the Army Quartermaster Corps during World War I). From 1922 to 1928 he held a faculty position at Northwestern, while also working with Paul W. Pettengill for their own accounting firm, Kohler, Pettengill & Co. From 1935 to 1937 he worked again for Arthur Andersen.

During this time, Kohler was the author or co-author of several books on accounting, including Accounting Principles Underlying Federal Income Taxes, Principles of Auditing, and Accounting for Business Executives. He was president of the American Accounting Association in 1936, a role he would reprise in 1946, and editor of The Accounting Review from 1928 until 1942.

In 1938, Kohler entered public service, as the controller of the Tennessee Valley Authority, a position he held until 1941. During World War II, he worked in the Office of Emergency Management and War Production Board, and the Petroleum Administration for War. He received the Gold Medal of the American Institute of Certified Public Accountants in 1945. He was controller of the Economic Cooperation Administration, which oversaw the Marshall Plan, in 1948 and 1949, but otherwise worked as a private consultant in the postwar period.

In 1937, the American Institute of Accountants' Committee on Terminology was disbanded. Kohler held strong beliefs that the terminology of accounting should be precise and meaningful, avoiding vague terms with situation-dependent meanings. To bring these ideas into accounting practice, and articulate his theories of proper accounting, he began working on his Dictionary for Accountants, which he finally published in 1952. The dictionary became his life work; it would go through five editions in his lifetime (the fifth in 1975) and more later.

In the 1950s and 1960s, as well as consulting and working on his dictionary, Kohler served as a visiting professor at several universities and wrote two more books, Accounting in the Federal Government and Accounting for Management. Alpha Kappa Psi gave him their Foundation Award in 1958. He became the 25th inductee into the Accounting Hall of Fame in 1961.

Kohler died, unmarried, on February 20, 1976.

== Selected publications ==
Kohler published a number of books and over 100 articles. Books, a selection:

- Kohler, Eric. Accounting Principles Underlying Federal Income Taxes, 1924.
- Kohler, Eric and Paul W. Pettengill. Principles of Auditing. 1924.
- Kohler, Eric and Paul L. Morrison. Principles of Accounting. 1926.
- Kohler, Eric. Accounting for Business Executives, 1927.
- Kohler, Eric. Advanced Accounting Problems and Solutions to Advanced Accounting Problems, 1939.
- Kohler, Eric. Auditing, An Introduction to the Work of the Public Accountant. 1947.
- Kohler, Eric. A Dictionary for Accountants, 1952.
- Kohler, Eric and Howard W. Wright. Accounting in the Federal Government, 1956.
- Kohler, Eric. Accounting for Management, 1965.
