= Roy B. Kester =

American accounting scholar (1882–1965)

Roy Bernard Kester (September 11, 1882 - October 21, 1965) was an American accountant, and Professor of accounting at the Columbia University. He is known as a prolific author in the field of accounting.

== Biography ==
Born in Cameron, Missouri to Julius B. and Jessie M. Corn Kester, Kester attended Cameron High School, and obtained his BA in economics in 1902 at Missouri Wesleyan College. About a decade later he obtained another BA from the University of Denver, in 1911. He continued his studies at Columbia University, where he obtained his MA in 1912 and his PhD in 1919. In between, in 1914, he obtained his CPA license for the State of Colorado.

Kester had started his academic career at the Missouri Wesleyan College in 1902, and from 1907 he was also lecturer at East Denver High School and subsequently at the University of Denver. In 1915 he moved to Columbia University in New York City, where he worked his way up from Assistant Professor in 1919, to Associate Professor in 1920, and to Full Professor in 1922. He served until his retirement in 1948. Among his PhD students was Henry Whitcomb Sweeney (1898-1967). From 1911 on, Kester also was working as a practising public accountant, and had joined the New York accountancy firm Boyce, Hughes and Farrell in 1917.

Kester was elected vice president of the American Accounting Association from 1922 to 1925, and served as its president during 1925. From 1925 to 1928 he served at the National Academy of Arbitrators as director of research in cost and management accounting, as successor of Professor Gould Harris of New York. In 1941 Kester was awarded an honorary Doctor of Laws degree by Baker University. He was inducted into the Accounting Hall of Fame in 1957.

== Selected publications ==
- Kester, Roy Bernard. Accounting theory and practice. Vol. 2. The Ronald Press Company, 1918.
- Kester, Roy Bernard. Depreciation. No. 28. Ronald Press Company, 1924.
- Kester, Roy Bernard. Advanced accounting, with practice problems. (1946).
