= Donald Kirk (disambiguation) =

Donald Kirk is an American war correspondent.

Donald Kirk may also refer to:

- Donald Kirk (bishop), Australian Anglican bishop
- Donald James Kirk, American accountant
