= Harold Q. Langenderfer =

American accounting scholar and educator

Harold Q. Langenderfer (July 21, 1925 – January 6, 2006) was an American accounting scholar, educator, and textbook author. He was a longtime professor of accounting at the University of North Carolina at Chapel Hill and served as president of the American Accounting Association from 1983 to 1984. Langenderfer was known for his contributions to accounting education, professional ethics in accounting, and widely used accounting textbooks. He received several national awards for excellence in accounting education, including the American Institute of Certified Public Accountants Distinguished Achievement in Accounting Education Award.

== Early life and education ==
Langenderfer was born on July 21, 1925, in Swanton, Ohio, the second of seven children. During World War II he served in the United States Army from 1943 to 1945, including service in Okinawa.

After the war he attended college, becoming the first member of his family to do so. He received a Bachelor of Science degree from Miami University in 1949, a Master of Business Administration from Northwestern University in 1950, and a Doctor of Business Administration in accounting from Indiana University in 1954.

His doctoral research examined the early history of the federal income tax in the United States, focusing on the Civil War–era tax system.

== Academic career ==
Langenderfer joined the faculty of the University of North Carolina at Chapel Hill in 1953 and spent more than four decades teaching accounting there. He later held the title of Peat, Marwick Main Professor of Professional Accounting, an endowed professorship associated with the accounting firm that later became part of KPMG. He eventually became professor emeritus.

During the early 1960s Langenderfer spent two years in Egypt advising and teaching in management development programs supported by the Ford Foundation. His experiences there led to research on management and organizational development in emerging economies.

Langenderfer became nationally prominent within the accounting profession through his teaching, scholarship, and professional service. In 1973 he was named to the advisory council of the newly established Financial Accounting Standards Board.

He served as president of the American Accounting Association for the 1983–1984 academic year. He also served as president of the North Carolina Association of Certified Public Accountants and held positions on state boards related to accounting and professional regulation.

Langenderfer retired from the UNC faculty in the 1990s after more than forty years of teaching.

== Scholarship ==
Langenderfer's research and writing focused on accounting education, professional ethics, auditing, and the history of accounting. His early scholarly work included research on management auditing and professional practice.

Among his notable articles were:

- Langenderfer, Harold Q., and Jack C. Robertson. “A Theoretical Structure for Independent Audits of Management.” The Accounting Review (1969).
- Langenderfer, Harold Q. “Accounting Education's History—A 100-Year Search for Identity.” Journal of Accountancy (1987).
- Langenderfer, Harold Q., and Joanne W. Rockness. “Integrating Ethics into the Accounting Curriculum: Issues, Problems, and Solutions.” Issues in Accounting Education (1989).

The 1989 article on ethics education became widely cited in discussions of ethics instruction in accounting curricula.

Langenderfer was also the author or coauthor of several widely used accounting textbooks, including:

- Principles of Accounting (with K. Fred Skousen).
- Financial Accounting (with K. Fred Skousen and W. Steve Albrecht).
- Personal Income Tax Procedure (with James B. Bower).

These textbooks were widely used in undergraduate accounting education.

== Awards and honors ==
Langenderfer received numerous professional awards recognizing his contributions to accounting education.

- President, American Accounting Association (1983–1984)
- American Institute of Certified Public Accountants Distinguished Achievement in Accounting Education Award (1988)
- American Accounting Association Outstanding Accounting Educator Award (1995)

At the University of North Carolina, the title Harold Q. Langenderfer Scholar of Accounting was later established in recognition of his contributions to the accounting program.

== Personal life ==
Langenderfer was married to his wife Joan for 55 years. They had four children.

He was active in the Kiwanis Club of Chapel Hill and served as its president. Outside of his academic work he enjoyed golf and community activities.

Langenderfer died on January 6, 2006, in Chapel Hill, North Carolina.

== Selected bibliography ==
- Langenderfer, Harold Q. The Federal Income Tax: 1861–1872. Indiana University doctoral research.
- Langenderfer, Harold Q., and Jack C. Robertson. “A Theoretical Structure for Independent Audits of Management.” The Accounting Review (1969).
- Langenderfer, Harold Q. “Accounting Education's History—A 100-Year Search for Identity.” Journal of Accountancy (1987).
- Langenderfer, Harold Q., and Joanne W. Rockness. “Integrating Ethics into the Accounting Curriculum: Issues, Problems, and Solutions.” Issues in Accounting Education (1989).
