= Leisenring =

Leisenring can refer to:

== Places ==
- Leisenring, Pennsylvania

== People ==
- John Leisenring (1853–1901), Republican member of the U.S. House of Representatives from Pennsylvania
- Brady Leisenring (born 1982) American hockey player
- Albert Leisenring Watson (1876–1960), American federal judge
- James J. Leisenring, American accountant
- Edward B. Leisenring, Jr. (1926–2011), president of the Westmoreland Coal Company
- Margaret Leisenring (1906–1926), who acted under the name Jean Stuart
