= Gerald A. Feltham =

Canadian accounting academic (1938–2019)

Gerald Albert Feltham (11 November 1938 – 21 December 2019) was a Canadian accounting researcher and educator.

He was Professor Emeritus at the Sauder School of Business at University of British Columbia. He also served on the faculty of Stanford University.

He was the co-author of books including:

- Cost Determination: A Conceptual Approach, with Joel S. Demski, 1976.
- Economics of Accounting, with Peter O. Christensen, 2005.

In 1994, along with co-author Joel S. Demski, he was awarded the Seminal Contributions in Accounting Literature Award of the American Accounting Association for their article "Economic Incentives in Budgetary Control Systems" published in The Accounting Review in April, 1978. He died on 21 December 2019 at the age of 81.

== Honors ==
He received the Outstanding Accounting Educator Award of the American Accounting Association in 1997. In 2003, he was elected to be a Fellow of the Royal Society of Canada. In 2004, Feltham was one of three inductees to the Accounting Hall of Fame. In 2005, he was awarded the Lifetime Contribution to Management Accounting Award from the Management Accounting Section of the American Accounting Association.
