= Katherine Schipper =

- Education: University of Dayton (BA); University of Chicago (MBA, MA, PhD)
- Occupations: Accounting researcher; educator

Katherine Schipper is an American accounting researcher and educator.

Currently the Thomas F. Keller professor of accounting at Duke University, she has also been a professor at University of Chicago and Carnegie-Mellon University. She is a past president of the American Accounting Association. Also, she has taught the MBA programs at University of Frankfurt's Goethe Business School.

For many years, she was editor of the Journal of Accounting Research, which is hosted at the University of Chicago.

She received the Outstanding Accounting Educator Award of the American Accounting Association in 1999. She began a five-year term as a member of the Financial Accounting Standards Board in 2001, and completed that in 2006. In 2007, Schipper was inducted into the Accounting Hall of Fame. She was the first woman and the 81st inductee.

== Education ==
She has a B.A. summa cum laude from the University of Dayton and M.B.A., M.A. and Ph.D. from the University of Chicago.
