= Elijah Watt Sells =

American accountant (1858–1924)

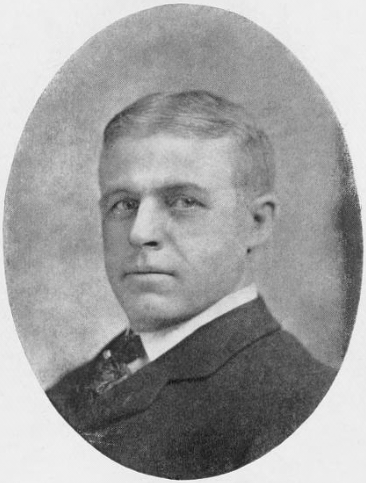
- Born: March 1, 1858; Muscatine, Iowa, US
- Died: March 19, 1924 (aged 66); New York, New York, US
- Occupation: Accountant
- Spouse: Mabel Graves (m. 1884)
- Children: 2

Elijah Watt Sells (March 1, 1858 – March 19, 1924) was an American accountant, and founding partner in Haskins & Sells, a predecessor to Deloitte & Touche.

== Life ==
Sells was born on March 1, 1858, in Muscatine, Iowa, to Elijah and Isabel Sells. He attended local public schools and briefly attended Baker University. Although he did not receive a degree, Baker University later awarded him an honorary degree. At age 16, Sells went to work for the Leavenworth, Lawrence & Galveston Railroad (later merged into the Atchison, Topeka and Santa Fe Railway and the BNSF Railway) and was quickly promoted. After working for several railroads, Sells was appointed to the Dockery Commission with his future business partner, Charles Waldo Haskins.

In 1884, Sells married Mabel Graves. They had two children. In 1895, Sells and Haskins formed Haskins & Sells, which was the first major accounting firm formed by American (rather than British) accountants. Sells became one of the first New York State certified public accountants in 1896 and then the firm's senior partner after Haskins' death in 1903.

Sells died at his home in Manhattan on March 19, 1924, at the age of 66.

== Award ==
In 1923, the American Institute of Certified Public Accountants (AICPA) created the Elijah Watt Sells award program. This award recognizes outstanding performance on the Uniform CPA Examination. The criteria for the award has changed over the course of its existence. Currently, the award is bestowed upon candidates who have obtained a cumulative average score above 95.50 across all four sections of the Uniform CPA Examination and passed all four sections of the Examination on their first attempt. Candidates are eligible for the award the calendar year following the year in which they completed testing.

== Selected publications ==
- Sells, Elijah Watt. Natural business year and thirteen other themes. A. W. Shaw Company, 1924.

About Elijah Watt Sells

- "Elijah Watt Sells." Haskins & Sells Bulletin, Vol. 3, no. 3 (March 1920), p. 20-22.
- Haskins & Sells. Haskins & Sells: the first fifty years, 1895-1945. Haskins & Sells, 1947.
- "In Memoriam: Elijah Watt Sells, March 1, 1858-March 19, 1924". Haskins & Sells Bulletin, Vol. 07, no. 04 (April 1924), p. 25-32.
- McCulloch-Williams, Martha. Land-Lover and his land. Mount Pleasant Press, 1909.
- "Mr. Haskins and Mr. Sells as Associates." Haskins & Sells Bulletin, Vol. 3, no. 3 (March 1920), p. 22-24.
