= George O. May =

American accountant (1875–1961)

George Oliver May
- Born: May 22, 1875; Teignmouth, Devonshire, England
- Died: May 25, 1961 (aged 86)
- Scientific career
- Fields: Accounting

George Oliver May (May 22, 1875 – May 25, 1961) was a British-American accountant. He led a joint study by the American Institute of Certified Public Accountants and the New York Stock Exchange that was impetus for the stock exchange requiring its listed firms to undergo independent annual audits. The study also is credited for causing the new Securities and Exchange Commission to allow the accounting profession to define accounting principles, rather than taking on that responsibility itself.

He rose to senior partnership in Price Waterhouse & Co. and wrote more than 100 articles in professional journals.

In 1941, he was elected as a Fellow of the American Statistical Association. In 1944, he received the AICPA's Gold Medal Award. In 1950, he was named with two others to the Accounting Hall of Fame, in its first year.

Lynn Turner, chief accountant of the SEC credits George O. May with contributing to the development of stronger authorities on accounting, noting in 1952 that May commented "'accounting income was on its way to becoming a political, not an economic concept'".

== Sources ==
- Biography at OSU's Accounting Hall of Fame
- Stabler, Henry Francis. "May, George Oliver (1875-1961)." In History of Accounting: An International Encyclopedia, edited by Michael Chatfield and Richard Vangermeersch. New York: Garland Publishing, 1996. pp. 407–409.
