= Victor Hermann Stempf =

Victor Hermann Stempf (April 28, 1893 - April 18, 1946) was an American accountant and administrator, known as the 7th inductee into the Accounting Hall of Fame in 1952.

== Life and work ==
Born in Minneapolis, Minnesota, Stempf obtained his BA in economics in 1915 at from St. Louis University, and obtained his license as Certified Public Accountant in 1917.

After graduation in 1915 Stempf started working as accountant for Touche Ross & Co. (now part of Deloitte Touche Tohmatsu), becoming a partner in the firm in 1922. Stempf was the only person to serve as President of three of the largest accounting organizations of the United States: He was President of New York State Society of CPAs NYCPA in 1939–40, President of the NA(C)A in 1940–41, and President of the American Institute of Certified Public Accountants AI(CP)A in 1943–44.

During his career as accountant, Stempf was Visiting Professor at several universities, including the St. Louis University. At the University City, Missouri he was treasurer, and in Mamaroneck, New York he was the city's Police Commissioner from 1936 to 1945. He made significant contributions to the 1934 Accountants' Handbook, and the 1944 Costs Accountants' Handbook (1944), and published a series of articles on various accountancy topics.

== Selected publications ==
- Stempf, Victor H. Preparation of Balance Sheets for Audit. Touche, Niven, 1934.
- Stempf, Victor H. McDowell, Maxwell E., Significant departures in the 1936 Revenue act. (1937).

Articles, a selection:

- Stempf, Victor H. "A critique of the tentative statement of accounting principles." The Accounting Review 13.1 (1938): 55–62.
- Stempf, Victor H. "Accounting Standards." The Journal of Accountancy (1942): 61–74.
- Stempf, V. H. "Pension plans." NACA Bulletin 24.9 (1943): 521–532.
- Stempf, Victor H. "War contracts, costs, and profits." Journal of Accountancy 75.6 (1943): 496–509.
