= Eugene Lee (sports agent) =

American sports agent (born 1973)

- Born: February 14, 1973 (age 53); Canton, Ohio, United States
- Education: Notre Dame
- Occupations: Sports Agent, Lawyer
- Years active: 1998-present
- Website: http://mbksports.com

Eugene Lee (born February 14, 1973) is an American sports agent. With over eighteen years of experience as an NFLPA certified contract advisor, Lee has represented over fifty NFL players over the past decade.

== Education ==
Lee earned his Bachelor of Business Administration degree, summa cum laude, in Accountancy from the University of Notre Dame and his Juris Doctor degree from Notre Dame Law School. Lee was a member of Beta Alpha Psi and Beta Gamma Sigma.

=== ETL Associates, Inc. ===
Lee served as the founder and president of ETL Associates, Inc. ("ETL"), his first NFL player representation agency from May 2001 to April 2015.

=== MBK Sports Management Group, LLC ===
After ETL Associates, Inc., Lee formed MBK Sports Management Group, LLC in May 2015. It is an NFL player representation agency headquartered out of New York City with offices in Cleveland and Los Angeles.

== Television and Film ==
=== ESPN's 30 for 30 "The Dotted Line" ===
Lee was the NFL agent featured in Morgan Spurlock's 2011 ESPN 30 for 30 documentary about the inside world of sports agents. The documentary, titled The Dotted Line, revealed the behind the scenes lives of top NFL, NBA, and MLB sports agents and followed their ups and downs from recruiting and marketing top-tier clients to negotiating record breaking contracts.

=== Television ===
Lee is a frequent guest on Fox News, Fox Business, CNN, CNBC, CBN, Bloomberg and other publications to provide insight as an industry expert on NFL player contracts, the salary cap, the collective bargaining agreement and athlete branding.

== Author and speaking engagements ==
In October 2015, Lee published his first book, My Brother’s Keeper: Above and Beyond The Dotted Line with the NFL’s Most Ethical Agent. The book focuses on several NFL players in various stages of their careers and the integrity and faith with which Lee conducts his business in an otherwise cutthroat industry.

Lee speaks at law schools nationwide, including Harvard, Fordham University, NYU and Notre Dame. He is also an adjunct assistant professor of American studies at Notre Dame.

== Philanthropy ==
Lee serves on the Board of Directors for the New York City chapter of Positive Coaching Alliance, a not-for-profit organization dedicated to the development and well-rounded growth of student-athletes and coaches nationwide.
