= Charles Ezra Sprague =

American accountant and constructed language advocate

Charles Sprague
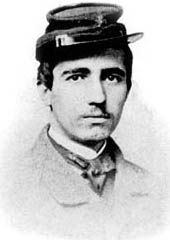
- Sprague, taken sometime in 1863 or 1864.
- Born: Charles Ezra Sprague; October 9, 1842; Nassau, New York, U.S.
- Died: March 21, 1912 (aged 69)
- Military career
- Allegiance: The Union
- Service years: 1863-1865
- Units: 44th New York Infantry Regiment

Charles Ezra Sprague (October 9, 1842 – March 21, 1912) was an American accountant, born in Nassau, Rensselaer County, New York. He was a proponent of the constructed language Volapük, for which he authored the first major textbook in English, Handbook of Volapük (1888), as well as an early organizer of the accounting profession.

During the American Civil War, Sprague served in the 44th New York Infantry, seeing action at the Battle of Gettysburg, where his unit was instrumental in helping repulse attacks on Little Round Top. The New York State Archives stores a lengthy article Sprague wrote on his military service.

He was president of both the New York Institute of Accounts and the Union Dime Savings Bank (which later became the Dime Savings Bank). Later in life, he was involved in the movement for reform of English spelling as part of the Simplified Spelling Board, of which he was the first treasurer.

He was heavily involved in the development of the first state certification of accountants in the United States.

In 1953 he was inducted into Ohio State University's Accounting Hall of Fame.

Sprague was the maternal grandfather of science fiction author L. Sprague de Camp.
