= Vernon K. Zimmerman =

American accounting scholar

Vernon Kenneth Zimmerman (born 1928 - 21 November 1996) was an American accounting scholar and Professor of accounting at the University of Illinois Urbana Champaign, known for his work on the accounting history and international accounting theory.

== Biography ==
Zimmerman obtained his BS in economics in 1949 at the University of Illinois College of Liberal Arts and Sciences, where he also obtained his MS in 1949 and his phD in 1954 under A.C. Littleton.

After graduation Zimmerman spend his academic career at the University of Illinois, where he was eventually appointed Professor of accounting. In 1963 he was founding director of the International Center for Accounting Education and Research. From 1967 to 1985 he also served as dean of the College of Commerce and Business Administration. In the year 1979-80 he was President of the American Assembly of Collegiate Schools of Business.

In 1965 Zimmerman was awarded a Guggenheim Fellowships. Recently the UIUC College of Business has renamed the Center for International Education and Research in Accounting (CIERA) to the Vernon K. Zimmerman Center.

== Death ==
Zimmerman died on November 21, 1996, at the age of 68 in Urbana, Illinois, following a distinguished career in accounting education and administration. Memorial tributes from 1996 to 1998, including condolences and remembrances, are documented in his archival collection.

== Selected publications ==
- Littleton, Ananias Charles, and Vernon Kenneth Zimmerman. Accounting theory, continuity and change. Prentice-Hall, 1962.
- Zimmerman, Vernon Kenneth, ed. Changing international financial markets and their impact on accounting. Center for International Education and Research in Accounting, Dept. of Accountancy, 1992.

Articles, a selection:

- Kafer, Karl, and Vernon K. Zimmerman. "Notes on the evolution of the statement of sources and application of funds'." The International Journal of Accounting 2.2 (1967): 89-121.
- Hassan, Nairn, and Vernon K. Zimmerman. "International Accounting Standards: Desirable as a Short-term Solution in the Case of the Arab Gulf States?." The Recent Accounting and Auditing Developments in the Middle East. Urbana-Champaign: University of Illinois (1985): 69-100.
