= Nicholas Dopuch =

American accounting researcher and educator

- Born: November 15, 1929
- Died: February 4, 2018 (aged 88)
- Occupations: Accounting researcher and educator

Nicholas Dopuch (November 15, 1929 – February 4, 2018) was an American accounting researcher and educator. He was a professor at Olin Business School at Washington University in St. Louis.

In 2006, Dopuch was named to the Accounting Hall of Fame. His 1993 article, "A Perspective on Cost Drivers" (The Accounting Review, Vol. 88, No. 3), is an example of why Dopuch was named to the Accounting Hall of Fame.
