= Edmund Lowell Jenkins =

American accountant

Edmund Lowell Jenkins (June 18 1935 - December 2 2020) was a leading accountant in the United States. He was chairman of the Financial Accounting Standards Board during a period in which it addressed controversial issues by adopting a standard for derivative accounting and eliminating pooling-of-interest accounting for U.S. publicly traded firms.

He was one of two individuals inducted into the Accounting Hall of Fame in 2005.
