= Elmer B. Staats =

American public servant

Elmer Boyd Staats
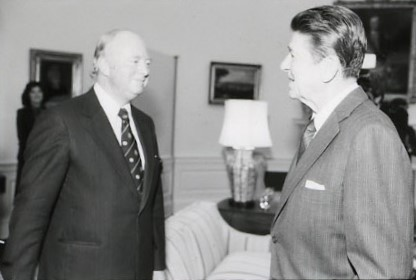
- With Ronald Reagan in 1981

5th Comptroller General of the United States
- In office March 4, 1966 – March 3, 1981
- President: Lyndon B. Johnson; Richard M. Nixon; Gerald R. Ford; Jimmy Carter; Ronald Reagan
- Preceded by: Joseph Campbell
- Succeeded by: Charles Arthur Bowsher

Personal details
- Born: June 6, 1914 Richfield, Kansas
- Died: July 23, 2011 (aged 97) Washington, D.C.
- Resting place: Woolrich, Pennsylvania
- Spouse: Margaret Rich
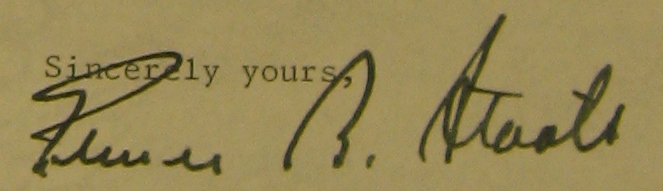
- Signature

Elmer Boyd Staats (June 6, 1914 – July 23, 2011) was an American public servant whose career from the late 1930s to the early 1980s was primarily associated with the Bureau of the Budget (BOB) (now the Office of Management and Budget [OMB]) and the GAO. Staats was born to Wesley F. and Maude (Goodall) Staats. Staats received his AB from McPherson College in 1935, his MA from the University of Kansas in 1936, and his Ph.D. from the University of Minnesota in 1939.

Married on September 14, 1940, to Margaret S. Rich, the couple had three children: David, Deborah, and Catharine. In 1939, Staats became a staff member in the Executive Office of the President, U.S. Bureau of the Budget. He worked his way up at BOB until 1947, when he was promoted to assistant to the Director of the Bureau, then executive assistant to the director (1949–1950), before he held the position of Deputy Director (1950–1953 and 1958–1966). In 1966, Staats became Comptroller General of the United States and head of the General Accounting Office (GAO), holding that position until 1981. Elmer Boyd Staats: An Inventory of His Personal Papers, 1961–1963 in the John F. Kennedy Library; National Archives and Records Administration (Papers at JFK library)

== Early life ==
Staats was born in 1914, in Richfield, Kansas, the son and one of eight children of Wesley Forrest and Maude Goodall Staats. His early life was spent on a farm in the Kansas wheat belt. In 1940 he married Margaret Rich, the daughter of Congressman Robert Fleming Rich of Pennsylvania, a textile manufacturer and banker who had a distinctly conservative record in Congress. The couple had three children: David, Deborah, and Catharine. Staats was a member of the Cosmos and Chevy Chase Clubs and the Metropolitan Memorial United Methodist Church of Washington, DC.

== Academic background ==
Staats was valedictorian of the 1931 graduating class of Sylvia High School in Sylvia, Kansas. Staats attended McPherson College, operated by the Church of the Brethren in McPherson, Kansas, where he received a A.B. in 1935, graduating Phi Beta Kappa. He then went to the University of Kansas, where he received an M.A. in political science and economics in 1936. After this, he entered the University of Minnesota's doctoral program in political economy, earning his by a Ph.D. in 1939.

== Career in government service ==
=== Early public service ===
Staats first entered public service in 1936, after graduating with his master's degree from the University of Kansas, where he spent that summer as a research assistant for the Kansas Legislative Council of Topeka. He was a member of the staff of the Public Administration Service of Chicago from 1937 to 1938 while he was working on his doctorate at the University of Minnesota. He was a Fellow of the Brookings Institution in Washington from 1938 to 1939.

=== Direct service to Presidents while at BOB and NSC from 1939 to 1966 ===
Staats joined the Bureau of the Budget (now the OMB) during the administration of President Franklin Roosevelt and was employed by the BOB from 1939 to 1953. At BOB, he served in the Division of Administrative Management (1939–1943), in the War Agencies Section (1943–47), and as its chief (1945–1947). During World War II, Staats was responsible for organizing, financing, managing, and coordinating the principal civilian war agencies. After the war, Staats was promoted to assistant to the BOB director (1947), assistant director in charge of Legislative Reference (1947–1949), executive assistant director (1949–1950), and, following appointment by President Harry Truman, to the deputy director of the agency (1950–1953).

Staats left government service for a year after the Eisenhower presidential transition, and during most of 1953 he served as research director for Marshall Field & Company. He returned to government service when he was appointed by President Dwight Eisenhower to serve as Executive Officer of the Operations Coordinating Board of the National Security Council, which was responsible for coordinated implementation of US foreign policies and operations in foreign countries. Staats served from 1954 to 1958.

In 1958, Staats returned to BOB and served as assistant director (September 1958 – March 1959) before being reappointed deputy director by President Eisenhower (March 1959–61). Staats continued in the deputy director position under Presidents John F. Kennedy and Lyndon Johnson.

=== Comptroller General from 1966 to 1981 ===
Staats left BOB to become the 5th comptroller general of the United States in 1966. On February 11, 1966, President Johnson nominated Staats for the position of Comptroller General, which also involves serving as head of the GAO. The United States Senate Committee on Government Operations held a hearing on March 2, 1966 on Johnson's nomination of Staats to be Comptroller General, endorsed it on the same date, and on March 4, 1966, the US Senate officially confirmed the nomination of Staats to become Comptroller General. Staats was sworn in as Comptroller General by President Johnson on March 8, 1966, at a ceremony at the White House.

Staats served until his term, expired on March 3, 1981. As Comptroller General, Staats drew on his many years of government experience, including as a former Deputy Director of the Bureau of the Budget under Presidents Truman, Eisenhower, Kennedy, and Johnson, as he led GAO during a period of change and national turmoil.

In reflecting on Staats's tenure, a senior GAO manager referred to him in 1981 as "a pragmatic agent of good government," who viewed GAO's reports as "a way to achieve results rather than simply hitting someone over the head." Staats was a strong advocate of public service and constructive change, who worked to improve management throughout the government. Within GAO, he practiced a participatory management style, often relying on task forces to study job processes and organizational issues. Staats focused on improving GAO's internal planning processes and on expanding its work and issue areas to more effectively serve the Congress. Not only the comptroller general broadened GAO's work but also he increased the agency's services to Congress. When Staats took charge of GAO in 1966, less than ten percent of the total effort of its professional staff went toward providing direct assistance to the Congress. By the time he left office in 1981, the number had risen to nearly 40 percent.

Under Staats, GAO worked on a number of issues of great national importance. Before the Federal Elections Commission assumed oversight of campaign expenditures in 1974, GAO's Office of Federal Elections undertook a number of reviews, some of which touched on Watergate. GAO also did important work on energy issues, consumer protection, the economy, and New York City's fiscal crisis. As the Vietnam War intensified and defense spending rose, Staats in 1966 opened an office in Saigon, the capital of South Vietnam. GAO's auditors worked in the field as well as in Saigon. Some of the fieldwork was done under hazardous circumstances. In 1969, six auditors narrowly escaped injury during a rocket attack on the base at Da Nang, South Vietnam. GAO's Saigon office remained operational until the peace accords in 1973.

During his tenure, Staats worked to improve governmental accountability. He revitalized GAO's work with the Joint Financial Management Improvement Program. Under Staats, GAO took a lead role in issuing auditing guidance. In 1970, the Bureau of the Budget and GAO agreed on the formation of a government auditing standards task force, which undertook a lengthy research and drafting process. As a result of the work of the task force, the Comptroller General issued in 1972 the first edition of the Standards for Audit of Governmental Organizations, Programs, Activities & Functions, which came to be known as the "Yellow Book." In later years, GAO gave the book a more concise title, Government Auditing Standards, and updated its guidance periodically. In addition to issuing guidance to help state and local auditors, the Comptroller General played a key role in establishing intergovernmental audit forums in the 1970s.

As comptroller general, he served as the first chairman (1970–1981) of the Cost Accounting Standards Board, and as a member of a number of Presidential and Governmental Advisory Bodies, including the Commission on Government Procurement (1971–1973); President's Commission on Budget Concepts (1967–1968); Commission on Federal Paperwork (1976–1978); Treasury Department's Advisory Committee on Federal Consolidated Financial Statements (1976–1979); National Advisory Committee for the Work in America, Inc. (1979–1980); Chrysler Loan Guarantee Board (1980–1981); Board of Governors, International Organization of Supreme Audit Institutions (1969–81), Technology Assessment Advisory Council (1972–1981); Joint Financial Management Improvement Program (1966–1981); and the President's Management Improvement Council (1979–80). GAO changed radically during the Staats period. These changes generally reflected the shift to program evaluation, the emergence of a host of new foreign and domestic problems, and Congress's increasing assertiveness in its relationships with the executive branch. Staats provided effective leadership as GAO strove to meet the new challenges, as he was widely respected in the Congress and in the government as a whole.

=== Later life ===
After serving as Comptroller General, Staats became the president and later chairman of the Board of Trustees of the Harry S. Truman Scholarship Foundation until his death in 2011.

== Other professional activities and associations ==
In addition to his government service, Staats made contributions though his numerous professional activities and associations. Staats has held membership on the Board of Trustees of the National Institute of Public Affairs (1969–77) and the Public Administration Service, Chicago (1967–74). He was chairman of the Conference on the Public Service, Brookings Institution (1958–60), and during 1979-80 he was a member of the Committee for the National Congress on Church-Related Colleges and Universities. He also served on

- the Board of Directors of the Eisenhower Foundation;
  - the Board of Trustees of the Kerr Foundation
  - the Board of Trustees of the George C. Marshall Foundation; and
  - the Board of Overseers of the Malcolm Baldrige National Quality Award.

He also has served on the board of directors of several corporations.

Over the years Staats has maintained a close relationship with educational institutions. He has served as a lecturer at American University (1941–43) and George Washington University (1944–46). During the period 1947–53, he was on the Advisory Council of the Department of Politics at Princeton University. During 1974-80 he was on the Visiting Committee of the John F. Kennedy School of Government at Harvard University.

In addition, Staats served on the Board of Trustees of McPherson College (1969–79) and the American University (1966–80). He has also been a member of the visiting committees of several universities.

Staats was an honorary member of the faculty of the Industrial College of the Armed Forces (1973; member, Board of Advisors 1974–77), and he has been a member of the Board of Visitors of the National Defense University since 1981.

Staats has also been active in numerous professional organizations, including:

  - The American Society for Public Administration (ASPA): Staats was a founding member of the organization in 1939, served as president of ASPA's Washington, D.C. chapter (1948–49), and as ASPA's national president (1961–62) and vice president (1959–61).
  - American Academy of Political and Social Science (AAPSS): Staats has been a member of the Board of Directors (1966–present).
  - National Academy of Public Administration (NAPA): Staat was a founding member of the organization in 1967, and has served as a member of the NAPA Board of Trustees (1967–85; chairman, 1985).
  - The Financial Accounting Standards Advisory Council (FASAC) member (1977–81)
  - Governmental Accounting Standards Board (GASB) member since its formation in 1984.
  - He has also been active for many years in the Conference Board, the American Management Association (AMA), and the Association of Government Accountants (AGA).

Staats has written many articles for professional journals and has made numerous speeches to professional organizations. Stasts holds membership in Phi Beta Kappa (1936), Pi Sigma Alpha (1936), Beta Alpha Psi (1966), Alpha Kappa Psi (1971), and Beta Gamma Sigma (1973).

== Honors and awards ==
Staats held honorary degrees from eight universities and distinguished service awards from the University of Kansas and the University of Minnesota. Other honors include Phi Beta Kappa, Alpha Kappa Psi, the Rockefeller Public Service Award, the Productivity Award of the American Productivity Center, the Medal of Honor of the American Institute of Certified Public Accountants, the Presidential Citizens Medal, the Hubert H. Humphrey Medal, and the Public Service Achievement Award of Common Cause. Staats also received the Public Service Medal of the Holland Society of New York, the Executive Government Award of the Opportunities Industrial Corporation of America, and the Public Service Award of the General Accounting Office. Staats was named an honorary member of the National Security Industrial Association and elected to the Accounting Hall of Fame in 1981.

Among the many honors bestowed upon him were the Rockefeller Public Service Award (1961); Alumni Achievement Award, University of Minnesota (1964); Distinguished Service Citation, University of Kansas (1966); Distinguished Service Award, University of Hartford Center for Study of Professional Accounting (1973); Warner W. Stockberger Achievement Award (1973); Person of the Year Award, Washington Chapter of the Institute of Internal Auditors (1975); Abraham O. Smoot Public Service Award, Brigham Young University (1975); American Association for Budget and Program Analysis Award (1976); Evaluation Research Society Federal Executive Award (1980); Productivity Award, American Productivity Center (1980); Medal of Honor, AICPA (1980); Engineer of the Year Award, San Fernando Valley Engineers Council (1980); and the Thurston Award, International Institute of Internal Auditors (1988).

Staats was an honorary member of the International City Management Association (1976), Society of Manufacturing Engineers (1978), National Security Industrial Association (1981), and an honorary life member of the Municipal Finance Officers Association of the United States and Canada (1980).
