= Walter P. Schuetze =

Walter P. Schuetze (August 2, 1932 - October 27, 2017) was Chief Accountant of the U.S. Securities and Exchange Commission during 1992-1995, and the Chief Accountant of the Commission's Enforcement Division between 1997 and 2000. He is known for being an advocate of mark-to-market accounting, which increases consistency between accounting statements' asset values and actual values of assets.

Scheutze's testimony before congress in 2002 regarding the collapse of Enron was, in part, as follows: "The problem is rooted in our rules for financial reporting. Those financial reporting rules need deep and fundamental reform. Unless we change those rules, nothing will change. The problems will persist. Today’s crisis as portrayed by the surprise collapse of Enron is the same kind of crisis that arose in the 1970s when Penn Central surprisingly collapsed and in the 1980s when hundreds of savings and loan associations collapsed, which precipitated the S&L bailout by the Federal government. Similar crises have arisen in Australia, Canada, Great Britain, and South Africa. There will be more of these crises unless the underlying rules are changed."

In 2008, he was listed in the Accounting Hall of Fame.
