= Howard Irwin Ross =

Canadian accountant (1907–1974)

- Born: 10 December 1907; Montreal, Quebec
- Died: 18 September 1974 (aged 66); Montreal, Quebec
- Education: McGill University (BA '30); University of Oxford (MA '32)
- Spouse: Dorothy St Clair (m. 1938)

Howard Irwin Ross OBE (10 December 1907 – 18 September 1974) was a Canadian accountant, academic administrator, and Chancellor of McGill University.

== Life and career ==
Born in Montreal, Quebec, the son of John Wardrop and Gertrude Holland Ross, he attended Lower Canada College before receiving a Bachelor of Arts degree from McGill University in 1930. He received a Master of Arts degree from the University of Oxford in 1932. He was also a Chartered accountant. He joined his family's firm of Touche Ross & Co. (now part of Deloitte Touche Tohmatsu) in 1932 and was a partner from 1942 to 1969.

From 1955 to 1956, he was the President of the McGill University Graduates' Society and as a Governor from 1956 to 1964. He was also the eleventh Chancellor from 1964 to 1970. He resigned from his accounting practice in 1969, to become the first Dean of the Faculty of Management. He retired in 1973 and became a Professor Emeritus of Management. In 1974, the Howard Ross Library of Management was named in his honour.

In 1965, he received an honorary doctorate from Sir George Williams University, which later became Concordia University.

From 1958 to 1959, he was president of the Quebec Institute of Chartered Accountants and, from 1963 to 1964, the Canadian Institute of Chartered Accountants.

For his work during World War II as chairman on the Foreign Exchange Control Board and Administrator for the Wartime Prices and Trade Board, he was appointed an Officer of the Order of the British Empire (OBE) in 1946. He was the first non-U.S. citizen inducted into the Accounting Hall of Fame since Sir Arthur Dickinson in 1951.

In 1938, he married Dorothy Dean St. Clair. They had two children. His archives are held in the collection of the McGill University Archives.

Academic offices
Preceded by Ray Edwin Powell	Chancellor of McGill University; 1964–1970	Succeeded by Donald Olding Hebb
