= William H. Beaver =

American accounting academic (1940–2024)

William Henry Beaver (April 13, 1940 – October 14, 2024) was an accounting researcher and educator. He was the Joan E. Horngren Professor of Accounting, Emeritus, at Stanford University. Early in his career, he was a professor at the University of Chicago.

He received his bachelor's degree in business administration from the University of Notre Dame and his MBA and PhD from the University of Chicago.

He served as president of the American Accounting Association from 1979 to 1981.

In 1989, he was awarded the Seminal Contributions in Accounting Literature Award for his article "Information Content of Annual Earnings Announcements" published in Journal of Accounting Research in 1968.

He received the Outstanding Accounting Educator Award of the American Accounting Association in 1990.

In 1996, he was one of three inductees to the Accounting Hall of Fame.

He died on October 14, 2024.
