= William J. Vatter =

American accounting scholar (1905–1990)

William Joseph Vatter (1905-1990) was an American accounting scholar and professor of accounting at the University of Chicago and at the University of California-Berkeley known for his "new approach to teaching managerial accounting."

== Biography ==
Born in Cincinnati, Ohio, Vatter grew up as a talented musician, who played the viola, piano and French horn. He wanted to become a symphony musician, but ended up as auditor, working for the Singer Corporation in the late 1920s. In the 1930s and 1940s he combined study and work. He obtained his BA from Miami University in Ohio in 1934, the CPA License for Ohio in 1936, and at the University of Chicago his MBA in 1937, and his PhD in 1946.

In 1934 he started his academic career at the Miami University in Ohio, and moved to the University of Chicago in 1936, where he taught accounting at its School of Business. In World War II he participated in the Manhattan Project, where he served as director of finance for the Metallurgy Laboratory from 1942 to 1944. Back at the University of Chicago he was appointed professor of accounting in 1946. From 1957 until his retirement in 1972 he was professor of accounting at the University of California-Berkeley.

Vatter was elected honorary fellow of the Australian Society of Accountants, and obtained the American Accounting Association's Outstanding Educator Award and the Centennial Citation from UC Berkeley. He was inducted into the Accounting Hall of Fame in 2004.

== Selected publications ==
- Vatter, William Joseph. The fund theory of accounting and its implications for financial reports. University of Chicago Press, 1947.
- Vatter, William Joseph. Managerial accounting. Prentice-Hall, 1950.

Articles, a selection:

- Vatter, William J. "Limitations of overhead allocation." Accounting Review (1945): 163-176.
- Vatter, William J. "Postulates and principles." Journal of Accounting Research (1963): 179-197.
- Vatter, William J. "Income models, book yield, and the rate of return." Accounting Review (1966): 681-698.
- Vatter, William J. "The use of operations research in American companies." Accounting Review (1967): 721-730.
