= Stephen A. Zeff =

American accounting historian

Stephen Addam Zeff
- Born: July 26, 1933 (age 93); Chicago, Illinois
- Education: University of Michigan
- Known for: Scholar of Financial Accounting, International Accounting
- Scientific career
- Fields: Comparative Hist. Development of Standard-Setting, Financial Accounting, History of Thought

Stephen Addam Zeff (born July 26, 1933) is an American accounting historian, and Herbert S. Autrey Professor of Accounting at the Jesse H. Jones Graduate School of Business, Rice University, Houston, Texas, United States. He was inducted into the Accounting Hall of Fame in 2002.

== Life and work ==
Zeff was born in Chicago, Illinois, where his father ran a small industrial advertising agency. After his graduation from Highland Park High School in 1951, he went to the University of Colorado Boulder, where he obtained his BS in 1955 with a major in accountancy and his MA in 1957. He then moved to the University of Michigan, where he received his Master of Business Administration in 1960 and his PhD in 1962. Recently he received an honorary doctorate in economics from the Turku School of Economics and Business Administration, in Finland.

During his undergraduate years, Zeff worked as an editor for the Colorado Daily, the student newspaper. He became the newspaper's managing editor in his senior year. In 1955 he became an instructor at the University of Colorado Boulder. At the University of Michigan, he taught accounting courses, was assistant of Herb Miller revisioning accounting books, and was research assistant at its Bureau of Industrial Relations. After his graduation in 1961, he was appointed assistant professor at Tulane University, and associate professor in 1963 and professor of accounting in 1966. In 1978 he moved to Rice University, where he is Herbert S. Autrey Professor of Accounting since 1979.

Over the years Zeff has been a visiting professor at the University of California at Berkeley, University of Chicago, Harvard Business School, Northwestern University, and the University of Texas at Austin. He has also been outside the United States in universities in Mexico, Australia, New Zealand, and the Netherlands.

=== Honors ===
- In 1988, he received the American Accounting Association’s Outstanding Accounting Educator Award
- In 1999 the American Accounting Association’s International Accounting Section named him the recipient of its International Accounting Educator Award
- Hourglass Award, Academy of Accounting Historians, in both 1973 and 2001
- Basil Yamey Prize, Accounting, Business & Financial History, 2004
- The only non-British member of the academic panel of the Accounting Standards Board of the United Kingdom
- From 1981 to 2004, he was the only non-European on the executive committee of the European Accounting Association
- From 1991 to 2002, he was the International Accounting Adviser for the Institute of Chartered Accountants of Scotland, which recognized him as its Honorary Research Fellow in 2003
- In 2002 he was inducted as the 70th member of Accounting Hall of Fame

== Selected publications ==
Zeff has authored and/or edited about 25 books and over 100 articles. Books, a selection:

- Zeff, Stephen A. The Accounting postulates and principles controversy of the 1960s, 1982.
- Zeff, Stephen A. Uses of accounting for small business. 1962.
- Zeff, Stephen A. The rise of economic consequences. Division of Research, Graduate School of Business Administration, Harvard University, 1978.

Articles, a selection:

- Zeff, Stephen A. "Forging accounting principles in five countries: A history and an analysis of trends" (1971).
- Dyckman, Thomas R., and Stephen A. Zeff. "Two decades of the Journal of Accounting Research". Journal of Accounting Research (1984): pages 225–297.
- Zeff, Stephen A. "Political lobbying on proposed standards: A challenge to the IASB". Accounting Horizons 16.1 (2002): pages 43–54.
- Zeff, Stephen A. "How the US accounting profession got where it is today: Part I". Accounting Horizons 17.3 (2003): pages 189–205.
- Zeff, Stephen A. "How the US accounting profession got where it is today: Part II". Accounting Horizons 17.4 (2003): pages 267–286.
