= Frank P. Sanders =

American politician

Frank Powell Sanders (July 13, 1919 – August 18, 1997) was United States Assistant Secretary of the Navy (Financial Management and Comptroller) 1971–72 and Under Secretary of the Navy 1972–73.

== Biography ==
He was born in Tarboro, North Carolina, on July 13, 1919. During World War II, he joined the United States Army as a private in 1941. He ultimately attained the rank of captain and was awarded a Bronze Star and the European Theater Ribbon for his military service. Sanders left the U.S. Army in 1945, but remained a member of the United States Army Reserve, ultimately attaining the rank of lieutenant colonel in the Reserves.

Colonel Sanders received a GED diploma and then attended the University of Maryland, ultimately receiving an M.A. in government and politics. He then attended the Georgetown University Law Center, from which he received a law degree.

In the late 1940s, Colonel Sanders was the administrative assistant of Rep. John H. Kerr (D - NC). Sanders then took a job with the staff of the United States House Committee on Appropriations, a position he would hold for 19 years.

President of the United States Richard Nixon nominated Sanders as Assistant Secretary of the Navy (Financial Management and Comptroller) in 1969, and Sanders served in this position to May 5, 1972. The next year, Nixon nominated Colonel Sanders as Under Secretary of the Navy and Colonel Sanders held this office from May 5, 1972, to June 29, 1973.

Colonel Sanders retired from federal service in 1973, moving to Bethesda, Maryland, and joining the Logistics Management Institute, a non-profit consulting organization focused on conducting studies for the United States Department of Defense. He later became head of the Washington, D. C. office of the Signal Companies, Inc., a California-based conglomerate engaged mainly in automotive and aerospace engineering and energy development (including oil and gas). Finally, in the mid-1970s, Colonel Sanders joined the Burma Oil and Gas Co. as a vice president, a post he held until his retirement in the mid-1980s.

Colonel Sanders died of a heart attack on August 18, 1997, at his home in Potomac. He was 78 years old.

Government offices
Preceded by Charles Arthur Bowsher	Assistant Secretary of the Navy (Financial Management and Comptroller); August 2, 1971 – May 5, 1972	Succeeded by Robert D. Nesen
Preceded by John Warner	Under Secretary of the Navy; May 5, 1972 – June 29, 1973	Succeeded by J. William Middendorf
