= The Accounting Review =

- Discipline: Accounting
- Language: English
- Edited by: Mary Barth

Publication details
- History: 1926–present
- Publisher: American Accounting Association (United States)
- Frequency: Bimonthly
- Impact factor: 3.993 (2020)

Standard abbreviations
- ISO 4: Account. Rev.

Indexing
- CODEN: ACRVAS
- ISSN: 0001-4826 (print); 1558-7967 (web)
- LCCN: 29008222
- JSTOR: 00014826
- OCLC no.: 865227376

Links
- Journal homepage; Online access; Online archive

The Accounting Review is a bimonthly peer-reviewed academic journal published by the American Accounting Association (AAA) that covers accounting with a scope encompassing any accounting-related subject and any research methodology. The Accounting Review is one of the oldest accounting journals, and recent studies considered it to be one of the leading academic journals in accounting.

The Accounting Review was established in 1926. In its early decades, the journal tended to publish articles that would be of interest to accounting practitioners, but over time it shifted towards a preference for quantitative model building and mathematical rigor. In the 1980s the AAA began to publish two other journals, Issues in Accounting Education and Accounting Horizons, that were more relevant to accounting educators and accounting practitioners respectively, to allow The Accounting Review to focus more heavily on quantitative articles.

== Overview and history ==
The Accounting Review is a bimonthly peer-reviewed academic journal covering accounting, and is the flagship journal of the American Accounting Association. Its current Senior Editor is Mary E. Barth (Stanford University). The journal's scope encompasses any accounting-related subject and any research methodology: as of 2010 the proportions of papers accepted for publication across subject areas and research methods was very similar to the proportion of papers received for review.

Submissions to The Accounting Review are reviewed by editorial board members and ad hoc reviewers. In 2009, the journal received over 500 new submissions a year, and about 9% of the decision letters sent to authors were acceptances or conditional acceptances.

=== Establishment to 1960s ===
The Accounting Review, launched in 1926 by William Andrew Paton, is one of the oldest academic journals in accounting. The American Association of University Instructors of Accounting, which later became the American Accounting Association, originally proposed that the association publish a Quarterly Journal of Accountics, but the proposal did not see fruition, and The Accounting Review was subsequently born. Paton served as editor and production manager in the journal's first three years.

In the first few decades following the journal's establishment, leading authors in The Accounting Review tended to write articles that would be of interest to accounting practitioners. The journal published articles that focused on accounting education and issues related to particular industries and trade groups, with many articles using anecdotal evidence and hypothetical illustrations. The longest-serving editor during this period was Eric Kohler, an accounting practitioner; Kohler served as editor from 1928 to 1942.

From the 1940s to the 1960s, The Accounting Review published articles of greater diversity, and leading authors during this period tended to have less practical accounting experience and more formal education. During this period, the three individuals that accounted for most of the editorial duties of the journal were A. C. Littleton (1944–1947), Frank Smith (1950–1959) and Robert Mautz (1960–1962), all of whom either had practical accounting experience, or were leading authors prior to 1945, when the journal was oriented towards the accounting practice.

=== 1960s to present ===
In the 1960s, the journal shifted towards a preference for quantitative model building including econometric models and time series models, and accepted more articles by non-accountants who contributed ideas from other disciplines in solving accounting-related problems. Since the late 1970s, accounting professors have opined that the journal was sacrificing relevance for mathematical rigor, and by 1982, accounting researchers realized that mathematical analysis and empirical research were a necessary condition for articles to be accepted.

In the 1980s, the AAA began to publish two other journals, Issues in Accounting Education and Accounting Horizons. Issues in Accounting Education, first published in 1983, was created to better serve accounting educators, while Accounting Horizons, first published in 1987, focused more on issues facing accounting practitioners. This permitted the journal "to focus more heavily on quantitative papers that became increasingly difficult for practitioners and many teachers of accounting to comprehend".

Between the 1980s and the 2000s, with the rise of databases such as Compustat and EDGAR and software such as SAS, articles became mathematically more rigorous with increasingly sophisticated statistical analyses, and accounting practitioners comprised a decreasing proportion of authors in the journal.

== Impact ==
According to the Journal Citation Reports, the journal had a 2020 impact factor of 3.993. Recent studies on accounting research and on doctoral programs in accounting considered The Accounting Review to be one of six leading accounting journals, and it is also one of the journals used by the Financial Times to compile its business school research rank.

== Abstracting and indexing ==
The journal is abstracted and indexed in the Social Sciences Citation Index, Current Contents/Social & Behavioral Sciences, and Scopus.

== Editors-in-chief ==
The following persons have been editors-in-chief:

- 1926–1929 William A. Paton
- 1929–1943 Eric L. Kohler
- 1944–1947 A. C. Littleton
- 1948–1949 Robert L. Dixon
- 1950–1959 Frank P. Smith
- 1959–1962 Robert K. Mautz
- 1962–1965 Lawrence L. Vance
- 1965–1967 Wendell Trumbull
- 1968–1970 Charles H. Griffin
- 1971–1972 Eldon S. Hendriksen
- 1973–1975 Thomas F. Keller
- 1976–1978 Don T. Decoster
- 1978–1983 Stephen A. Zeff
- 1983–1987 Gary L. Sundem
- 1987–1990 William Kinney
- 1990–1994 Ahmed Rashad Abdel-khalik
- 1994–1997 Robert P. Magee
- 1997–2000 Gerald L. Salamon
- 2000–2002 Linda Smith Bamber
- 2002–2005 Terry Shevlin
- 2005–2008 Dan S. Dhaliwal
- 2008–2011 Steven J. Kachelmeier
- 2011–2014 John Harry Evans III
- 2014–2017 Mark L. DeFond
