= Joseph Edmund Sterrett =

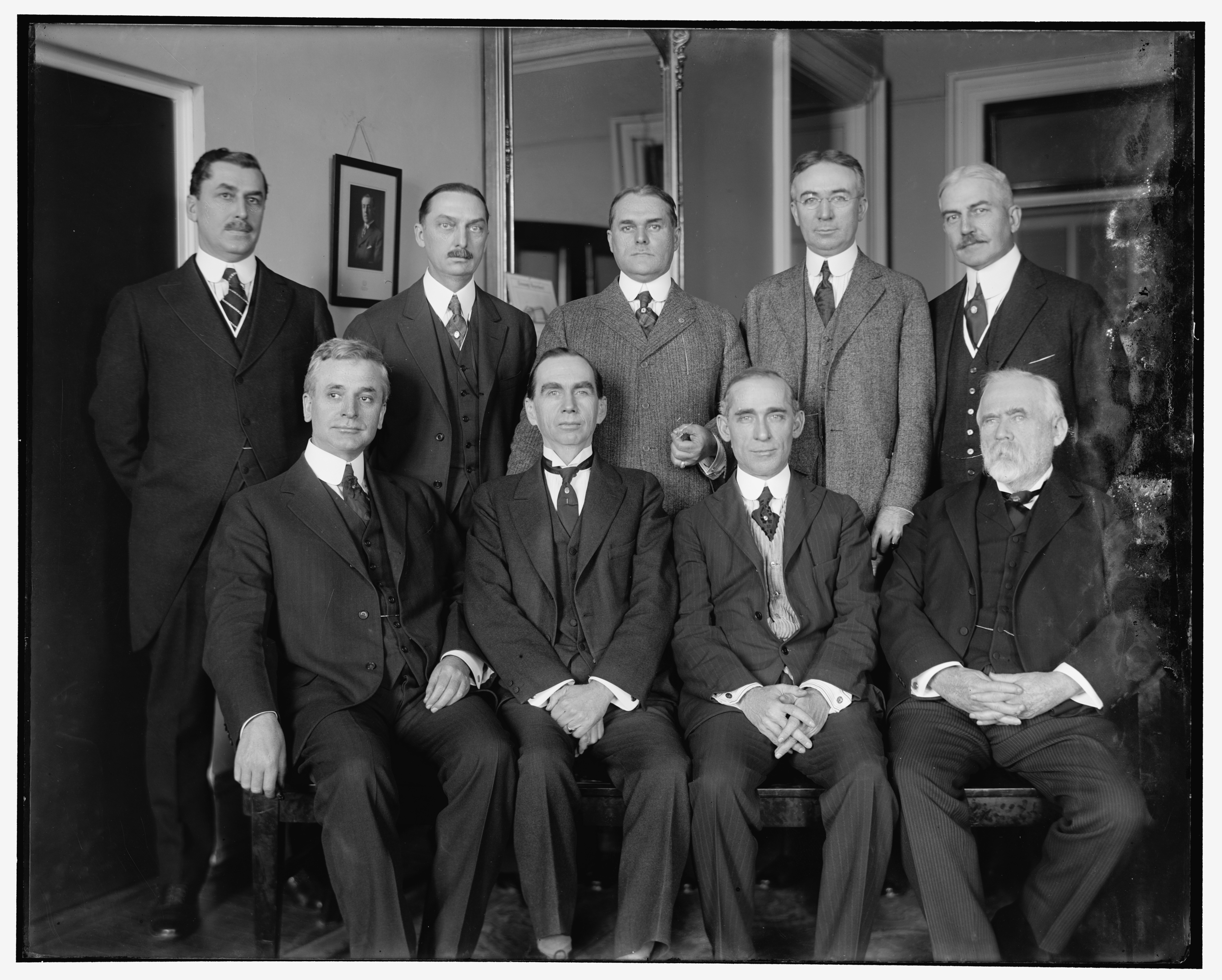
- Sterrett with the Excess Profits Advisory Board
- Born: June 17, 1870; Brockway, Pennsylvania
- Died: March 22, 1934 (aged 63)
- Occupation: accountant

Joseph Edmund Sterrett (June 17, 1870 – March 22, 1934) was an American accountant, known as one of "accountancy's most active pioneers" and the 11th inductee into the Accounting Hall of Fame in 1953.

== Biography ==
Born in Brockway, Pennsylvania to minister Ezekiel Sterrett and Martha Jane McCurdy Sterrett, Sterrett started working for a coal company in Beechtree, Pennsylvania at the age of 17, and moved into accountancy work. In 1899 he obtained his Certified Public Accountant license for the state of Pennsylvania.

At the age of 21 in 1891 Sterrett joined the public accountancy office of John W. Francis, where he became a partner in 1893. Their firm Francis & Sterrett merged into Price Waterhouse & Co. in 1907, whereby Sterrett became and remained senior partner. Sterrett was member of the American Institute of Certified Public Accountants, and served as its president from 1908 to 1910, its treasurer from 1919 to 1922, and its counsel member in 1916–18 and 1927–33. He was also one of the founding members of the Pennsylvania Institute of CPAs in 1897, where he also served in several functions.

Since the 1910s Sterrett was involved in public serves for the Federal Government, started with his participation in the Commission on Economy and Efficiency in 1911 and in the Excess profits tax during World War I. Merino (2014) summarized that "his work after World War I would bring him international recognition. In 1920 he set up the administration of the Repatriation Commission in France. In 1924 he was called back to Europe, where he spent two years as the American member of the Transfer Committee that managed reparation payments under the Dawes Plan. He received decorations from four countries, Belgium, France, Germany, and Italy, for his work on this committee."

== Work ==
=== Professional ethics, 1907 ===
In the 1922 article Ethics of Accountancy, Edward P. Moxey explained, that the subject of ethics for the accountant is one which has engaged the attention of the members of that profession for quite a number of years. In fact, the subject was one of those presented before the Congress of Accountants, meeting at St. Louis in September, 1904. Prior to that time, however, definite rules of professional conduct had been formulated by the accounting societies of England for their members. In the latter part of 1905 a bill was introduced into Parliament by the Government of Tasmania for the regulation of the profession of accountancy. This bill made mention specifically of certain actions on the part of accountants which were to be regarded as unprofessional, and the practice of which should render them liable to fine, suspension or expulsion.

Moxey (1922) further told, that at the Convention of the American Association of Public Accountants (now American Institute of Certified Public Accountants) held at St. Paul, Minnesota, in October, 1907, Sterrett presented a paper on "Professional Ethics" which became the standard treatise in the decades to come. This paper was characterized at that time by Robert Hiester Montgomery, as one "which bids fair to become a classic." Sterrett called attention to the fact that the older professions of law and medicine had even at that time (1907) made considerable progress in the development of systems of professional ethics, and called attention also to the work being accomplished along that line by the American Institute of Electrical Engineers. In measuring the distinction between the accountant as a member of one of the newer professions, as contrasted with the lawyer or physician, Sterrett stated:

A lawyer's real opinion of another lawyer, or that of one physician concerning another, is usually a much more accurate judgment of the man's character and ability than is indicated by the reputation which he bears in the community at large.
It may be that the opinion of the public and that of those who know the man from the inside, as it were, will coincide. This is likely to be the case with men of good ability and fine character, but the sham and the trickster are likely to be weighed and labeled by their professional brethren long before their real character is discovered by outsiders.
Under ordinary circumstances regard for the good name of his profession seals the lips of the professional man about matters concerning others in his own profession. The physician considers it quite unethical to pass harsh judgment upon his brother physician, except under the most urgent conditions. As accountants endeavoring to build up professional ideals, we should feel that the good name of -our profession requires us to avoid all needless reference to the weaknesses or imperfections of other accountants.

Moxey (1922) commented, that while since that time there have been more or less serious infringements of the rules of ethics as laid down for the guidance of accountants, yet these have been dealt with fairly and impartially by committees on professional conduct of the American Association of Public Accountants and of its successor, the American Institute of Accountants. The work of these committees has always tended towards the improvement and development of the profession, to the end that there shall be a recognition on the part of its practitioners as well as on the part of the general public, that all who are its members not only are those of high professional attainment, but those in whom the moral ideal exists in more than name only.

In recognition of Sterrett's contributions to the accounting profession, the Pennsylvania Institute of Certified Public Accountants recognizes donors who give $1,000 or more to the Pennsylvania CPA Foundation with the Joseph E. Sterrett Award. The Pennsylvania CPA Foundation's mission is to inspire students to pursue a career in accounting and provide educational, motivational, and financial support to those looking to earn the CPA credential.

== Selected publications ==
- Sterrett, Joseph Edmund. Professional ethics. 1907.
- Sterrett, Joseph Edmund. Every-day ethics; addresses delivered in the Page lecture series, 1909, before the senior class of the Sheffield scientific school, Yale university, (1910).
- Sterrett, Joseph Edmund, and Joseph Stancliffe Davis. The fiscal and economic condition of Mexico. 1928.
- Kirkbride, Franklin Butler, Joseph Edmund Sterrett, and Henry Parker Willis. The Modern Trust Company: Its Functions and Organization, an Outline of Fiduciary Banking. Macmillan, 1920.

Articles, a selection

- Sterrett, Joseph Edmund. "The profession of accountancy." Annals of the American Academy of Political and Social Science 28 (1906): 16–27.
