= Henry Rand Hatfield =

American accountant

Henry Rand Hatfield ( Nov. 27, 1866 - Dec. 25, 1945) was an American accountant and prominent pioneer in accounting education, known as author of the 1909 "Modern accounting: its principles and some of its problems."

== Life and work ==
Born in Chicago to Robert M. and Elizabeth Ann Taft Hatfield, Hatfield obtained his BA from Northwestern University in 1892, and his Ph.D. in political economy from University of Chicago in 1897.

Hatfield had started his career in the municipal bond field prior to his university studies. He started his academic career in 1894 as lecturer in political economics at the Washington University in St. Louis. After his graduation in 1898 he was employed by the University of Chicago as instructor, and promoted assistant Professor in 1902. From 1902 to 1904 he also served as dean of the College of Commerce and Administration. In 1904 he moved to the University of California, Berkeley as associate professor, and was Professor of accounting from 1909 until his death in 1945. He was Dean of the College of Commerce and Dean of the Faculty for several years.

Hatfield became the 5th inductee into the Accounting Hall of Fame in 1961.

== Selected publications ==
- Hatfield, Henry Rand. Modern accounting, its principles and some of its problems. D. Appleton, 1909.
- Hatfield, Henry Rand. Accounting, its principles and problems. Appleton, 1930.
- Sanders, Thomas Henry, Henry Rand Hatfield, and William Underhill Moore. A statement of accounting principles. American Institute of Accountants, 1938.

Articles, a selection

- Hatfield, Henry Rand. "The Chicago Trust Conference." The Journal of Political Economy 8.1 (1899): 1–18.
- Hatfield, Henry Rand. "What is the matter with accounting." The Journal of Accountancy 44.4 (1927): 267–279.
- Hatfield, Henry Rand. "Some variations in accounting practice in England, France, Germany and the United States." Journal of Accounting Research (1966): 169–182.
