= Blough, Pennsylvania =

Unincorporated community in Pennsylvania, US

Blough
- Unincorporated community
- Location within the state of Pennsylvania Blough (the United States)
- Coordinates: 40°10′18″N 78°54′29″W
- Country: United States
- State: Pennsylvania
- County: Somerset
- Elevation: 1,591 ft (485 m)
- Time zone: UTC-5 (Eastern (EST))
  - Summer (DST): UTC-4 (EDT)
- GNIS feature ID: 1169862

Blough is an unincorporated community and coal town in Somerset County, Pennsylvania, United States.
