= Harry Anson Finney =

American accounting scholar

Harry Anson Finney (November 19, 1886 – May 8, 1966) was an American accountant, and Professor of accounting at the Northwestern University. He is known as prolific author in the field of accounting. who had written a leading textbook in accounting, entitled "Principles of accounting" (1935).

== Biography ==
Born in Postville, Iowa to Solon B. and Ellen Bike Finney, Finney obtained his BA in economics in 1913 at the University of Chicago. In 1917 he obtained his CPA license for the state of Illinois.

After graduation Finney taught economics at a high school, and later at the Walton School of Commerce in Chicago. In 1920 he moved to the Northwestern University, where he was Professor of accounting until his retirement in 1944. Over the years he also worked as accountant. In 1923 he had joined the Haskins & Sells accountancy firm, and later founded Baumann, Finney & Company.

Finney was editor for the Journal of Accountancy from 1920 to 1928, and was elected President of the Illinois Society of CPAs for the year 1928–29. Finney authored and co-authored a series of successful textbooks on accounting, from which he sold in total more than two million copies.

== Selected publications ==
- Finney, Harry Anson and Joseph Clifton Brown. Modern Business Arithmetic, (1916)
- Finney, Harry Anson. "Introduction To Actuarial Science." American Institute of Accountants. (1920)
- Finney, Harry Anson. Consolidated statements for holding company and subsidiaries. Prentice-Hall, Incorporated. (1922).
- Finney, Harry Anson. Principles of accounting. (1935).
- Finney, H. A., Miller, H. E., Gentry, J. A., & Johnson, G. L. Principles of accounting: advanced (Vol. 2). Prentice-Hall. (1965).
- Finney, Harry Anson, and Herbert E. Miller. Answers to Questions and Solutions to Problems in Principles of Accounting: Intermediate. Prentice-Hall. (1965).
- Finney, H. A., Miller, H. E., Johnson, G. L., & Gentry, J. A. Principles of accounting. Prentice Hall. (1970).
