= Arthur Lowes Dickinson =

British chartered accountant

Sir Arthur Lowes Dickinson
- Born: Arthur Lowes Dickinson; 8 August 1859; Marylebone, London
- Died: 28 February 1935 (aged 75); London, England

Sir Arthur Lowes Dickinson (8 August 1859 – 28 February 1935) was a British chartered accountant in England and the United States of America.

Dickinson was the senior partner in the USA of Price Waterhouse (now PriceWaterhouseCoopers from 1901 to 1913, during which time he established the principles of consolidated accounting, to provide transparency about conglomerate companies. He was also instrumental in the beginnings of international efforts to establish international accounting standards. A professorship at the Harvard Business School is named after him.

== Life ==
Dickinson was the eldest son of Lowes Cato Dickinson, a Victorian portrait painter, and Margaret Ellen Williams, whose father had discovered Charlotte Brontë as reader for Smith, Elder, and Company. His younger brother, Goldsworthy Lowes Dickinson was a distinguished political scientist and philosopher. He also had five sisters.

He was educated at Charterhouse School, and at King's College, Cambridge, where he studied mathematics and graduated in 1882. He began a career in accountancy in 1883, and qualified as a chartered accountant in 1888, sharing first place in the Institute of Chartered Accountants' examinations with another candidate.

In 1901 he was posted to New York as the first resident senior partner in the USA of Price Waterhouse, then primarily a British partnership. One of his first acts was to devise a format for presenting the consolidated accounts of the United States Steel Corporation. From 1904 to 1906 he was President of the US Federation of Societies of Public Accountants, and in 1904 helped organise the First International Congress of Accountants in Saint Louis, Missouri, where he delivered a paper entitled "Profits of a Corporation" which set out the principles of consolidated accounting. In 1906 he became a naturalised US citizen, but returned to London in 1913, where he remained as a senior partner of Price Waterhouse until 1925.

From 1917 to 1920 he was financial adviser to the Coal Controller (the coal industry having been placed under centralised control during the First World War), and was awarded a knighthood for his services in this capacity in 1919. After his retirement from Price Waterhouse he maintained an interest in the coal industry, being a director of several coal companies.

In 1888 he married Mary Katherine Jennings. They adopted two daughters.

== Legacy ==
His work on developing consolidated accounting was important at a time (of the "Robber Barons" in the USA) when conglomerates' external and internal transactions were far from transparent. So too was his work in helping to establish international accounting standards. But he was critical of the dangers of viewing accountancy as a narrow and technical exercise; and his book Accounting Practice and Procedure (1913) sought to provide a deeper understanding of the nature and scope (but also limitations) of accountancy.
