= William Andrew Paton =

American accountancy scholar

William A. Paton
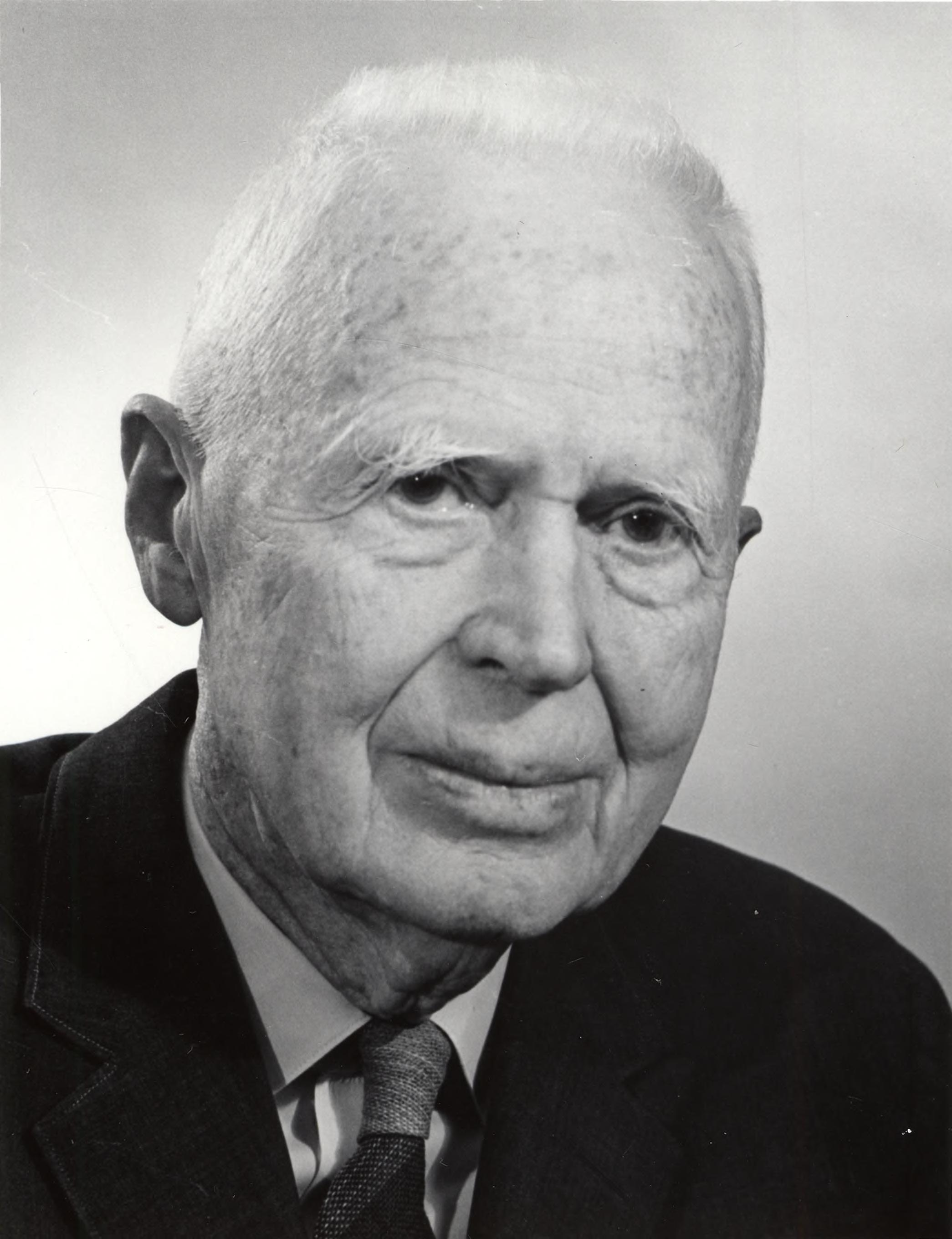
- Born: July 19, 1889 near Calumet, Michigan, US
- Died: April 26, 1991 (aged 101)
- Education: University of Michigan Ph.D. 1917
- Scientific career
- Fields: Accounting

William Andrew Paton (July 19, 1889 – April 26, 1991) was an American accountancy scholar, known as founder of the American Accounting Association in 1916, and was founder and first editor of its flagship journal The Accounting Review.

== Biography ==
Paton was born near Calumet, Michigan to Andrew Patton, teacher and superintendent of the local school system, and Mary Nowlin Paton, also teacher. The family settled on a farm, engaging Patton with farm work in his youth. Paton studied at the University of Michigan, where he obtained his AB and PhD in economics in 1917. In 1927, he obtained his Certified Public Accountant license for the State of Michigan.

After graduation Paton started his academic career at the University of Michigan in 1914. After a year as Assistant Professor at the University of Minnesota from 1916 to 1917, he returned to the University of Michigan, where he was professor of accounting and economics from 1921 to his retirement in 1958. He served as a visiting professor at the University of California, Berkeley (1937–38), Harvard University (1939–40), the University of Chicago (1959–60), and the University of Kentucky (1968–69). Over the years he has been practicing consulting accountant, especially during vacation periods.

In 1916, Paton co-founded the American Accounting Association, and served as its president from 1922 to 1923. He was founding editor-in-chief of its The Accounting Review from 1926 to 1929. In 1940, he and A. C. Littleton edited for the American Accounting Association the publication of An Introduction to Corporate Accounting Standards. Over the years Patton also participated in American Institute of Certified Public Accountants in several positions.

Paton received the AICPA's Gold Medal Award in 1944 and was inducted into the Accounting Hall of Fame in its first year, 1950. He was the recipient of the one-time "Outstanding Educator of the Century" prize by the American Institute of Certified Public Accountants, at the AICPA's 100th annual meeting in 1987. Paton died at the age of 101 on April 26, 1991.

== Selected publications ==
Paton published more than 150 articles and numerous books, on his own or with co-authors, including:

- Paton, William Andrew, and Russell Alger Stevenson. Principles of Accounting (1916)
- Paton, William Andrew, and Russell A. Stevenson. Problems and exercises in accounting. (1918)
- Paton, William Andrew. Accounting theory, with special reference to the corporate enterprise. Ronald Press, 1922.
- Paton, William Andrew. Essentials of Accounting (1938)
- Paton, William Andrew. Advanced Accounting (1941)
- Paton, William Andrew, and Earl Adolphus Saliers. Accountants' handbook. (1943).
- Paton, William Andrew, and Ananias Charles Littleton. An introduction to corporate accounting standards. No. 3. American Accounting Association, 1970.
