= Alnoor Bhimani =

British academic

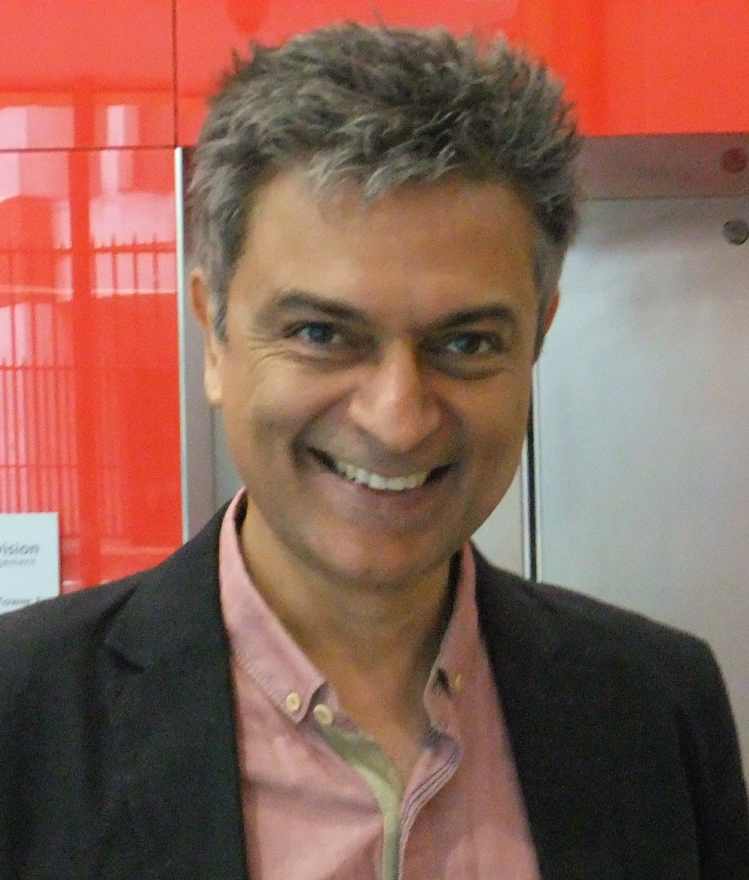
- Citizenship: British and Canadian
- Education: LSE; Cornell University
- Scientific career
- Fields: Management Accounting; Tech Entrepreneurship
- Workplaces: London School of Economics and Political Science

Alnoor Bhimani is Professor of Management Accounting at the London School of Economics and Political Science (LSE). He is former Head of the Department of Accounting and the Founding Director of LSE Entrepreneurship. He has also served as Director of the South Asia Centre. Bhimani's academic work covers financial management and digitalisation; entrepreneurship and economic growth; and global development and governance issues.

== Biography ==
Bhimani holds a BSc degree in food science and management from King's College London, an MBA from Cornell University where he was a Fulbright Scholar and obtained his PhD from London School of Economics. He is also a Chartered Professional Accountant (Canada). Bhimani took up a lectureship in accounting and finance at LSE in 1988 becoming professor from 2006. He headed the Department of Accounting at LSE during 2009-2012 and was Director of LSE Entrepreneurship from January 2014 until June 2015. He was also Director of LSE's South Asia Centre from 2020-2024 and Director of LSE Enterprise from 2016 to 2018.

Bhimani has been a visiting professor at various universities in Europe, North America, South Asia and Africa. He has been a Visiting Academic at Aalto University, Bocconi University, London Business School, ISCTE, University of Witwatersrand, University of Western Ontario, and York University (Canada). He has run courses in Cost Management; Strategy and Control; Tech Entrepreneurship; Financial Management and Corporate Governance; Developmental organizational Leadership.

Aalto University School of Business, Helsinki Finland, awarded Professor Bhimani an honorary doctorate in 2016 citing his impact on comparative management accounting research.

== Research and intellectual interests ==
Bhimani's research led to the development of comparative management accounting as an independent research discipline. He has conducted historical investigations on the emergence of accounting mechanisms indicative of the dependencies between structural accounting controls and cultural shifts over time. His research on accounting determinants of default investigates the role of non-financial information in averting financial crises. He has also investigated issues relating to accounting and digitization, artificial intelligence, blockchain, big data and analytics.

His books discuss management accounting research, with reference to practical organizational innovations in area such as costing for digital enterprises, strategic management accounting and budgetary control systems among others. His co-authored book with Michael Bromwich, entitled Management Accounting: Evolution not Revolution (1989), discusses strategic investment appraisal

Bhimani’s book with Bromwich, Management Accounting: Pathways to Progress (1994), talks about problems of maintaining a short-term and internally focused orientation to management accounting information in facing strong global competition. It mobilised new research avenues in cost management viewed offering ‘rich’ insights according to The Accounting Review. His book Management Accounting: Retrospect and Prospect (2009) assessed technological challenges faced by managerial accounting.

Bhimani's book Financial Management for Technology Start-ups (2022), discusses the financial and accounting know-how specific to running technology start-ups. His book titled Accounting Disrupted: How Digitalization is Changing Finance addresses how digital technologies such as AI, robotic process automation, the Internet of Things, blockchains and business analytics systems are changing accounting work and the finance function.

== Publications ==
- Bhimani, A.,Financial Management for Technology Start-ups, 2022 (Kogan Page)
- Bhimani, A., "Exploring big data's strategic consequences", Journal of Information Technology, (2015) http://www.palgrave-journals.com/jit/journal/vaop/ncurrent/full/jit201429a.html
- Bhimani, A.,Strategic Finance: Achieving High Corporate Performance, 2015 (Strategy Press)
- Bhimani, A.; Gulamhussen, M.; Lopes, S. (2014). "Owner liability and financial reporting information as predictors of firm default in bank loans". Review of Accounting Studies. 19 (2): 769–804.
- Bhimani, A.; Willcocks, L. (2014). "Big Data' and the transformation of accounting information". Accounting and Business Research. 44 (4): 469–490. doi:10.1080/00014788.2014.910051. S2CID 153725824.
- Bhimani, A.; Gulamhussen, M.; Lopes, S. (2013). "The role of financial accounting, macroeconomic and non-financial information in bank loan default timing prediction". European Accounting Review. 22 (4): 739–763. doi:10.1080/09638180.2013.770967. hdl:10071/11739. S2CID 154568868.
- Bhimani, A.; Bromwich, M. (2010). Management accounting: retrospect and prospect. London: Elsevier/CIMA. ISBN 9781856179058.
- Bhimani, A.; Gulamhussen, M.; Lopes, S. (2010). "Accounting and non-accounting determinants of default: An analysis of privately-held firms". Journal of Accounting and Public Policy. 29 (6): 517–532. doi:10.1016/j.jaccpubpol.2010.09.009.
- Bhimani, A., "Management Accounting Research: past forays and emerging frontiers" in Chapman, C.; Hopwood, A.; Shields, M. (2007). Handbook for Management Accounting Research. Oxford: Oxford University Press. pp. 343–364.
- Bhimani, A. (ed.), Contemporary Issues in Management Accounting, 2006 (Oxford: Oxford University Press)
- Bhimani, A. (ed.), Management Accounting in the Digital Economy, 2003 (Oxford: Oxford University Press)
- Bhimani, A. (2002). "European Management Accounting Research: Traditions in the Making". European Accounting Review. 11 (1): 99–118. doi:10.1080/09638180220142275. S2CID 154090210.
- Bhimani, A. (1999). "Mapping Methodological Frontiers in Cross-National Management Control Research". Accounting, Organizations and Society. 24 (5–6): 413–440. CiteSeerX 10.1.1.460.6902. doi:10.1016/S0361-3682(98)00068-3.
- Bhimani, A. (1998). "Knowledge, Motivation and Accounting Form: An Historical Explanation". European Accounting Review. 7 (1): 1–30. doi:10.1080/096381898336556.
- Bhimani, A. (ed.), Management Accounting: European Perspectives, 1996 (Oxford: Oxford University Press)
- Bhimani, A. (1994). "Accounting and the Emergence of Economic Man". Accounting, Organizations and Society. 19 (8): 637–674. doi:10.1016/0361-3682(94)90028-0.
- Bhimani, A. (1994). "Accounting Enlightenment in the Age of Reason". European Accounting Review. 3 (3): 399–442. doi:10.1080/09638189400000030.
- Bhimani, A., Bromwich, M., Management Accounting: Pathways to Progress, 1994 (London: CIMA)
- Bhimani, A. (1993). "Indeterminacy and the Specificity of Accounting Change: Renault 1898-1938". Accounting, Organizations and Society. 18: 1–39. doi:10.1016/0361-3682(93)90023-Y.
- Bromwich, M.; Bhimani, A. (1989). Management Accounting: Evolution not Revolution. London: CIMA. ISBN 9780948036651.
