= Aoi Mac Ollamain =

God of poetry in Irish mythology

Aoi Mac Ollamain or Ai Mac Ollamain (also Mac Ollamo and Mac Ollavain) is a god of poetry and one of the Tuatha Dé Danann in Irish mythology. Ai is the son of Olloman, who saved him from the king's decree that Aoi be killed, a decree made in response to a druid's prediction that Aoi would be born with special powers.
