= Philip W. Bell =

American accounting scholar (1924–2007)

- Born: 1924; New York City
- Died: 2007 (aged 82–83)
- Education: Princeton University; University of California, Berkeley

Philip Wilkes Bell (1924–2007) was an American accounting scholar and professor of accounting, known for seeking "to bring accounting and economics closer together."

== Biography ==
Bell was born in 1924 in New York City to Samuel D. Bell and Miriam Wilkes Bell. He obtained his BA in economics from Princeton University in 1947, his MA in economics from University of California, Berkeley in 1949, and back at Princeton his PhD in international economics in 1954 under guidance of Jacob Viner with the thesis, entitled "The Sterling Area in the Post-War World."

In World War II Bell had served as pilot in the U.S. Air Force, and back in the States he was correspondent for The New York Times in the year 1946–1947. In 1952 he started his academic career as assistant professor in economics at Haverford College. After other academic positions in economics at the University of California, Berkeley and Boston University, in 1978 he was appointed William Alexander Kirkland Professor of Accounting and Economics at Rice University.

Bell developed his interest in international economics, especially international financial flows, development economics and economic development. He was consultant for the U.S. Departments of Treasury and State, the U. S. Agency for International Development, and among others for the Kenyan government. He was inducted into the Accounting Hall of Fame in 2003.

== Selected publications ==
- Edgar O Edwards and Bell, Philip W. The theory and measurement of business income. Univ of California Press, 1961.
- Bell, Philip W., and M.P. Todaro. Economic Theory: An Integrated Text with Special Reference to Developing Areas Nairobi: Oxford University Press. 1969
- Edwards, Edgar O., Philip W. Bell, and L. Todd Johnson. Accounting for economic events. Scholars Book Company, 1979.

Articles, a selection:

- Bell, Philip W. "Private capital movements and the US balance of payments position." Factors affecting the United States balance of payments (1962): 395–481.
