= James J. Leisenring =

James J. Leisenring is a retired member of both the International Accounting Standards Board, based in London, and the Financial Accounting Standards Board (the FASB), based in Norwalk, Connecticut.

== Biography ==
He was director of research and director of international activities of the Financial Accounting Standards Board (FASB), and was the first chairman of FASB's Emerging Issues Task Force. Also he has served as chairman of the Auditing Standards Board of the American Institute of Certified Public Accountants.

He was one of three individuals inducted into the Accounting Hall of Fame in 2003.

Leisenring holds degrees from Albion College and Western Michigan University.
