= Donald James Kirk =

American journalist

Donald James Kirk (c.1933 – July 17, 2025) was an American accountant. He was chair of the Financial Accounting Standards Board.

Kirk was born in Cleveland, Ohio.

Kirk became a partner with Price Waterhouse in 1967.

Kirk was one of the initial board members appointed to the Financial Accounting Standards Board (FASB) in 1973. In 1977 he became the second chairman of FASB, and served in that role for 9 years until his eligibility expired. He oversaw the transition of FASB meetings from closed, confidential meetings to being open and public.

Kirk wrote 40 articles in professional journals, and he was a professor at Columbia University from 1987 to 1995.

Kirk was inducted into the Accounting Hall of Fame in 1996.

Kirk died on July 17, 2025, at the age of 92.
