= Carman George Blough =

American accounting scholar (1895-1981)

- Born: November 11, 1895; Johnstown, Pennsylvania
- Died: March 9, 1981 (aged 85)
- Education: Manchester College (B.A.); University of Wisconsin (M.A.)
- Occupation: Scholar

Carman George Blough (November 11, 1895 – March 9, 1981) was an American accountant, professor of accounting, and civil servant. He is described as "one of the most influential 'high priests' of the profession in the twentieth century." He was inducted into the Accounting Hall of Fame in 1954.

== Biography ==
Born in Johnstown, Pennsylvania, to Silas S. and Mary Wertz Blough, Blough obtained his BA in economics in 1917 from Manchester College, and his MA in 1922 from the University of Wisconsin. In the same year he obtained his CPA certification for the state of Wisconsin. In the year 1932–33 he did graduate work at Harvard University.

After his graduation in 1917 Blough started as lecturer at the Bridgewater College in 1917, spent two years at Fond du Lac, Wisconsin High School as head of the commercial department, and was instructor in accounting at the University of Wisconsin from 1920 to 1922. From 1922 to 1929 he was employed in the state of Wisconsin civil administration. In 1929 he was appointed professor at the University of North Dakota and head of its accounting department, and in 1933 he moved to the Armour Institute of Technology, where he was professor and head of the social science department for another year.

In 1934 Blough was among the first to join the new U.S. Securities and Exchange Commission. He started as staff member, and became the first Chief Accountant of the commission.

From 1938 to 1942 he joined Arthur Andersen & Co. as partner, but resigned when the United States entered World War II, serving in several federal functions. In 1944 he became research director at the American Institute of Certified Public Accountants, and was an adjunct professor of accounting at Columbia University from 1947 until his retirement in 1961.

== Publications ==
- Blough, Carman George. Some Accounting Problems of the Securities and Exchange Commission. 1937.

About Carman George Blough

- Scott, Richard A., and Elizabeth G. Ward. "Carman G. Blough: His Personality and Formative Years." The Accounting Historians Journal (1982): 53–60.
- Maurice Moonitz. "Memorial: Carman George Blough 1895–1981," The Accounting Review, Vol. 57, No. 1 (Jan., 1982), pp. 147–160
