= Ananias Charles Littleton =

American accounting scholar (1886–1974)

- Born: December 4, 1886; Bloomington, Illinois, US
- Died: January 13, 1974 (aged 87)
- Known for: founder of Beta Alpha Psi

Academic background
- Education: University of Illinois Urbana-Champaign, B.A. 1912, M.A. 1918, and Ph.D. 1931.

Academic work
- Discipline: Accounting
- Institutions: University of Illinois Urbana-Champaign

Ananias Charles (A. C.) Littleton (December 4, 1886 – January 13, 1974) was an American accounting scholar and professor of accounting at the University of Illinois. He is known as prominent educator, and for his work on the history of accounting. He was a founder of Beta Alpha Psi honor society.

== Biography ==
Born in Bloomington, Illinois to Robert and Mary Sholtey Littleton, Littleton attended Bloomington High School. He took his studies at the University of Illinois, where he obtained his B.A. in 1912, his M.A. in 1918, and eventually his Ph.D. in 1931. In 1919 he obtained his C.P.A. license for the state of Illinois.

After high school, Littleton had started working for the Chicago & Alton Railroad Company as station agent and telegraph operator, before returning to the university. After receiving his B.A. in 1912, he worked as accountant for Deloitte, Plender, Griffiths & Co. from three years, before starting his academic career in 1915 at the University of Illinois. He started as instructor, became assistant professor in 1920, associate professor in 1925, and was professor in 1931. He was one of the honor society. From 1919 to 1921 he served as assistant dean of the College of Commerce and Business Administration, and was assistant director of the Bureau of Economic and Business Research of the College of Commerce from 1921 to 1942. He retired in 1952.

Littleton was editor-in-chief of The Accounting Review from 1944 to 1947. He was inducted into the Accounting Hall of Fame in 1955.

== Selected publications ==
- Littleton, Ananias Charles. Accounting evolution to 1900. Univ of Alabama Pr, 1933.
- Littleton, Ananias Charles. Structure of accounting theory. No. 5. Amer Accounting Assn, 1953.
- Littleton, Ananias Charles, and Vernon Kenneth Zimmerman. Accounting theory, continuity and change. Prentice-Hall, 1962.
- Paton, William Andrew, and Ananias Charles Littleton. An introduction to corporate accounting standards. No. 3. American Accounting Association, 1970.

Articles, a selection:

- Littleton, Ananias Charles. "Value and price in accounting." Accounting Review (1929): 147–154.
- Littleton, Ananias Charles. "Value or cost." Accounting Review (1935): 269–273.
