= Charles Waldo Haskins =

American accountant and businessman

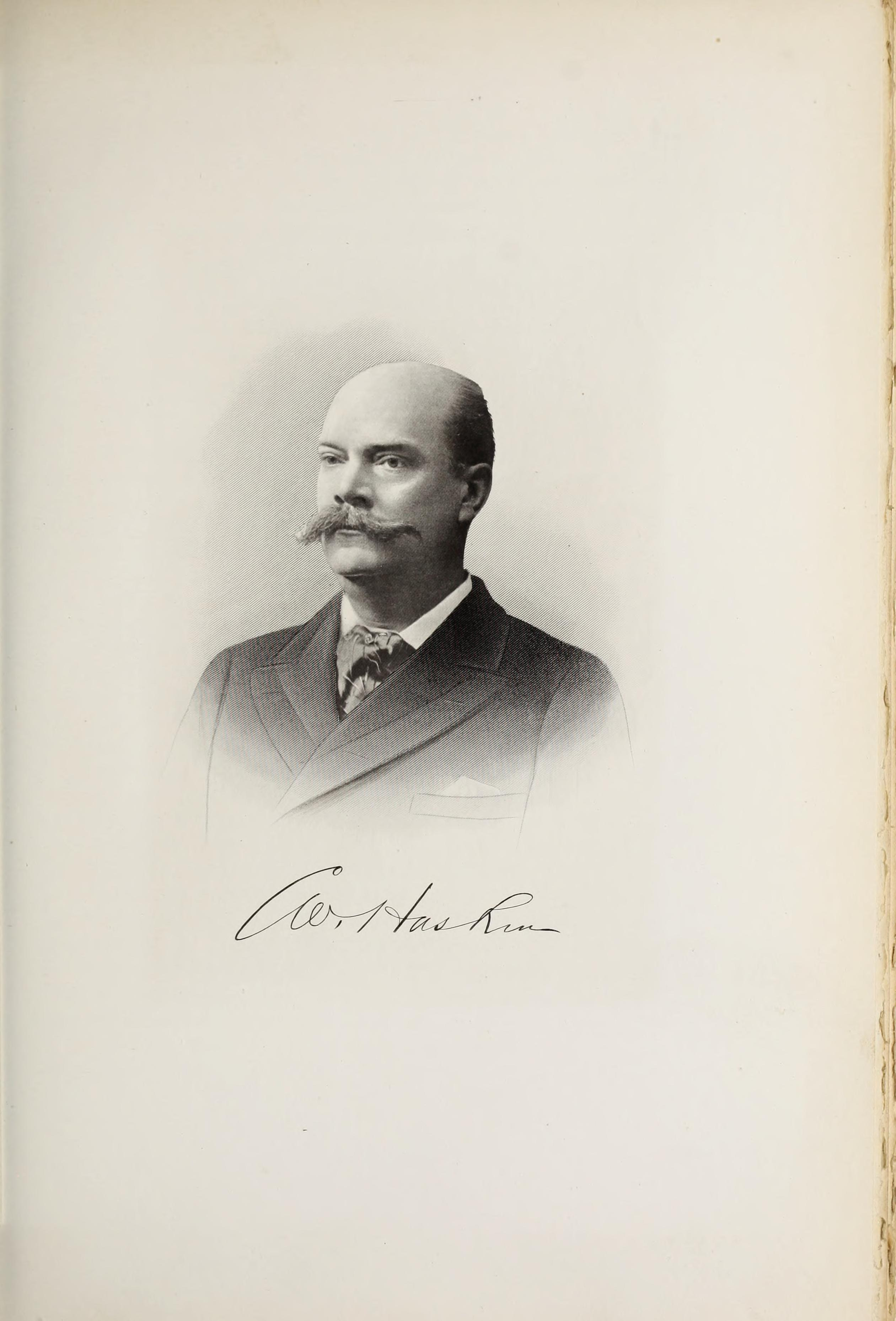
- Born: January 11, 1852; Brooklyn, New York, US
- Died: January 9, 1903 (aged 50); New York City, US
- Education: Brooklyn Polytechnic Institute
- Occupation: Accountant
- Spouse: Henrietta Havemeyer (m. 1884)
- Children: 2

Charles Waldo Haskins (January 11, 1852 – January 9, 1903) was an American accountant, and co-founder of the accounting firm Haskins and Sells, a predecessor to Deloitte.

== Biography ==
Charles Waldo Haskins was born in Brooklyn, New York, in 1852, "into a leading American family (including uncle Ralph Waldo Emerson)".

Haskins was educated at the Brooklyn Polytechnic Institute, now called the NYU Tandon School of Engineering, where he earned a degree in civil engineering, and subsequently completed his studies in Paris. His wife, Henrietta Havemeyer, whom he married in 1885, was from a family even wealthier than his own - the Havemeyer family of New York. Her uncle was three times Mayor of New York, and her grandfather controlled the American Sugar Refining Company ("Domino"). Descended from John Howland, a signer of the Mayflower Compact, Haskins was a New York Member of the Sons of Liberty and other local societies along with the local branch of the (President) Adams family (with whom he was also related).

Haskins advocated unified and reliable accounting principles, lecturing widely on history and methods. He was known to describe the public accountant as "the consulting physician of finance and commerce." Haskins stated that the public accountant "understands the anatomy and physiology of business and the rules of health of corporations, partnerships, and individual enterprises. He diagnoses abnormal conditions and suggests approved remedies. His study and interest is the soundness of the world of affairs."

Haskins was heavily involved in codifying qualifications and created the legislation and bodies that defined the first Certified Public Accountant qualifications in the nation for New York State, which were later emulated throughout the US.

Haskins served as president of the New York State Society of CPAs and the American Society for CPAs. In 1900, Haskins founded the earliest professional school of business, The School of Commerce, Accounts, and Finance of New York University, and the first university accounting program in America. Haskins was the first dean of the school, a post he held until his death in 1903.

== Death ==
Haskins died from pneumonia at his home in New York on January 9, 1903. An obituary in a leading New York newspaper alluded to his character, accomplishments, and circumstances:

Mr. Haskins occupied a position singular and unique in relation to his fellows in the profession; removed from all the petty jealousies engendered by the battle for a livelihood; possessing means more than ample for the requirements of himself and his personal family, he gave freely in time, money, and influence to every movement designed to place the certified public accountant on a par in the eyes of the world with the professions of law and of medicine.

== Bibliography ==
- Atlantic Publishing and Engraving Co. "Biographical sketch of Professor Charles Waldo Haskins, C.P.A." Contemporary American Biography, 1901, Vol. 3 (advance sheets) Full-text
- "Charles Waldo Haskins."Haskins & Sells Bulletin, Vol. 03, no. 03 (March 1920), p. 18-19 Full-text
- Coffman, Edward N. "Haskins, Charles waldo (1852-1903)." In History of Accounting: An International Encyclopedia, edited by Michael Chatfield and Richard Vangermeersch. New York: Garland Publishing, 1996. pp. 292–293.Full-text
- "Four Early Railroad Accountants." H&S Reports, Vol. 02, (summer 1965), p. 22-23. Full-text
- Jordan, William George, 1864-1928. Charles Waldo Haskins, an American pioneer in accountancy. Prentice Hall, 1923.Full-text
- "Mr. Haskins and Mr. Sells as Associates." Haskins & Sells Bulletin, Vol. 03, no. 03 (March 1920), p. 22-24 Full-text
- Queenan, John W. "Haskins & Sells at Seventy-five." H&S Reports, Vol. 07, (winter 1970), p. 2-3.Full-text
