= American Accounting Association =

Academic association

- Formation: 1916; 110 years ago as the American Association of University Instructors in Accounting; 1936; 90 years ago as the American Accounting Association
- Website: aaahq.org

The American Accounting Association (AAA) promotes accounting education, research and practice. The Association mission is to further the discipline and profession of accounting through education, research and service.

The organization is the largest association of accountants in academia. AAA also focuses on: information systems, artificial intelligence/expert systems, public interest, auditing, taxation, international accounting, teaching, and curriculum.

== History ==
Incorporation papers in the District of Columbia in the name of “The American Association of University Instructors in Accounting” were registered in 1916 as noted in the AAA's 50-year history, American Accounting Association: Its First Fifty Years, 1916–1966. On occasion of its 75th year The Third-Quarter Century of the American Accounting Association 1966-1991 was published in 1991.

The American Accounting Association marked its centennial in 2016. The Association's centennial volume, Years of Transition: The American Accounting Association 1991-2016, is a "contextualized history of the AAA, with close attention paid to the AAA’s interactions with its institutional, economic, educational, technical, professional, regulatory, and social environment."

== Leadership ==
The Board of Directors (2026–2027) consists of 12 members. The current president is Gary A. McGill, J. Roy Duggan Professor and Interim Dean University of Florida Warrington College of Business. The other leadership positions are: President-Elect, Past-President, Vice President of Finance, Vice President of Finance-Elect, Vice President of Research & Publications, Vice President of Education, Director Focusing on Membership, Director Focusing on International, Director Focusing on Segments, Director Focusing on Intellectual Property, and Director Focusing on Academics and Practitioner Interaction.

== Sections ==
The AAA has 17 sections: Academy of Accounting Historians, Accounting Behavior and Organizations, Accounting Information Systems, American Taxation Association, Auditing, Engagement, Access, and Community, Financial Accounting and Reporting, Forensic Accounting, Gender Issues and Worklife Balance, Government and Nonprofit, International Accounting, Leadership in Accounting Education, Management Accounting, Public Interest, Strategic and Emerging Technologies, Teaching, Learning and Curriculum, and Two-Year College.

== Publications ==
The AAA publishes three general interest accounting journals, The Accounting Review, Accounting Horizons, and Issues in Accounting Education.

AAA also publishes a number of specialty journals The Journal of the American Taxation Association; Auditing: A Journal of Practice & Theory; Current Issues in Auditing; The Journal of Financial Reporting; Journal of Forensic Accounting Research; Journal of Governmental & Nonprofit Accounting; Journal of International Accounting Research; Journal of Management Accounting Research; Accounting and the Public Interest; Accounting Historians Journal; and Journal of Emerging Technologies in Accounting.

== Awards ==
The AAA major awards presented at the annual 'Global Gathering' conference:

- The J. Michael and Mary Anne Cook Prize - foremost recognition of an individual who consistently demonstrates the attributes of a superior teacher in the discipline of accounting.
- Deloitte Wildman Medal Award - to the author(s) of the article, monograph, book, or other work, is judged to have made or will be likely to make the most significant contribution to the advancement of the practice of public accountancy (including audit, tax, and management services.)
- Competitive Manuscript Award- encourages research among members of the Association who have earned their Ph.D. within the past five years.
- Lifetime Service Award- recognizes service contributions to accounting education over a sustained period of time.
- Notable Contributions to Accounting Literature Award.
- Outstanding Accounting Educator Award.
- The Accounting Horizons and Issues in Accounting Education Best Paper Awards.

== Accounting Hall of Fame ==
The Accounting Hall of Fame established at Ohio State University in 1950 is maintained by the AAA. It recognizes distinguished contributions to the progress of accounting.

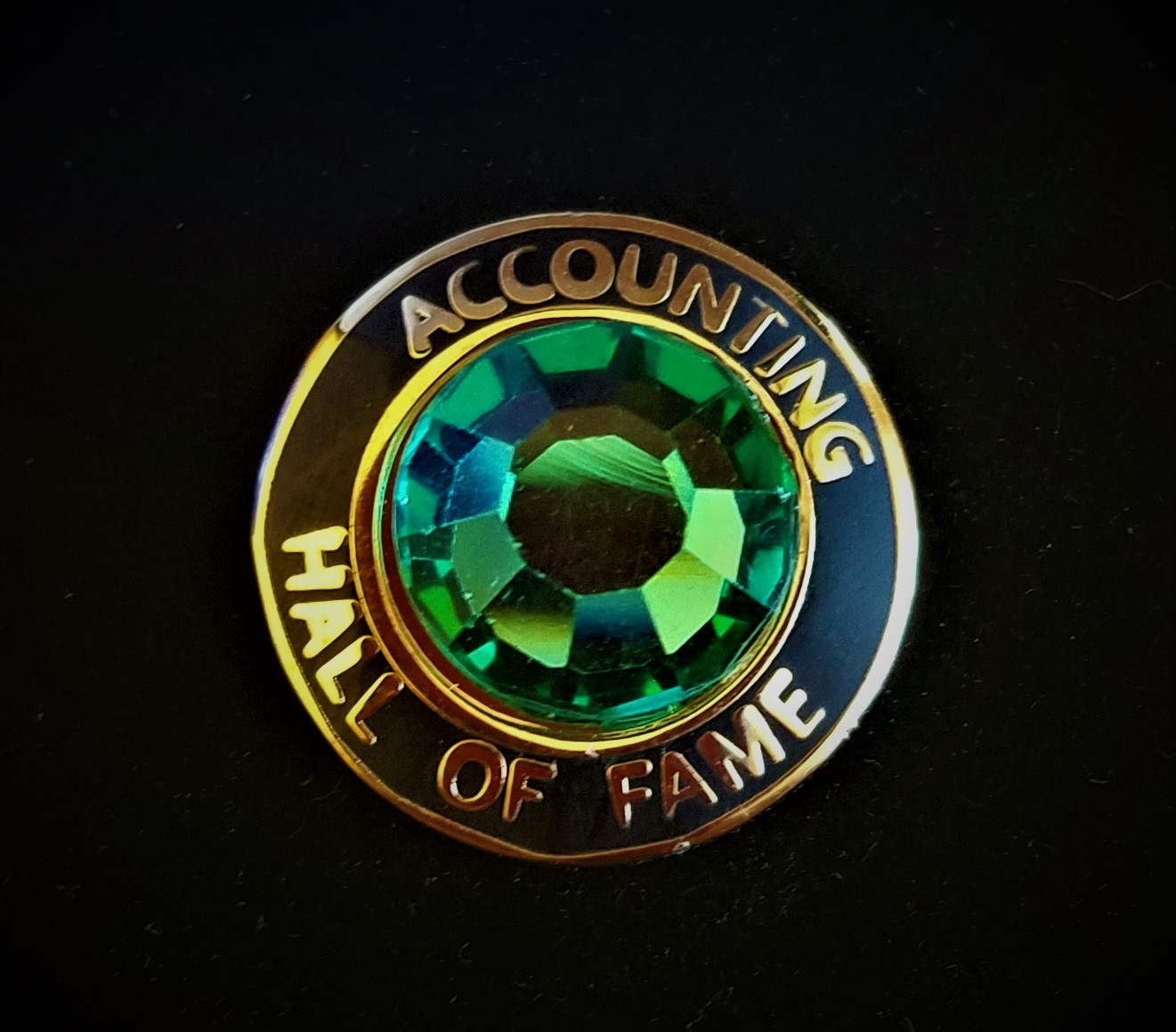
The Accounting Hall of Fame Pin
