= Index of accounting articles =

This page is an index of accounting topics.

== A ==
Accounting ethics - Accounting information system - Accounting research - Activity-Based Costing - Assets

== B ==
Balance sheet - Big Four auditors - Bond - Bookkeeping - Book value

== C ==
Cash-basis accounting - Cash-basis versus accrual-basis accounting - Cash flow statement - Certified General Accountant - Certified Management Accountants - Certified Public Accountant - Chartered accountant - Chart of accounts - Common stock - Comprehensive income - Construction accounting - Convention of conservatism - Convention of disclosure - Cost accounting - Cost of capital - Cost of goods sold - Creative accounting - Credit - Credit note - Current asset - Current liability

== D ==
Debitcapital reserve - Debit note - Debt - Deficit (disambiguation) - Depreciation - Diluted earnings per share - Dividend - Double-entry bookkeeping system - Dual aspect

== E ==
E-accounting - EBIT - EBITDA - Earnings per share - Engagement letter - Entity concept - Environmental accounting - Expense - Equity - Equivalent Annual Cost

== F ==
Financial Accounting Standards Board - Financial accountancy - Financial audit - Financial statement - Fixed assets - Fixed assets management - Forensic accounting - Fraud deterrence - Free cash flow - Fund accounting

== G ==
Gain - General ledger - Generally Accepted Accounting Principles - Going concern - Goodwill - Governmental Accounting Standards Board

== H ==
Historical cost - History of accounting

== I ==
Income - Income statement - Institute of Chartered Accountants in England and Wales - Institute of Chartered Accountants of Scotland - Institute of Management Accountants - Intangible asset - Interest - Internal audit - International Accounting Standards Board - International Accounting Standards Committee - International Accounting Standards - International Federation of Accountants - International Financial Reporting Standards - Inventory - Investment - Invoices - Indian Accounting Standards

== J ==
Job costing - Journal

== L ==
Lean accounting - Ledger - Liability - Long-term asset - Long-term liabilities - Loss on sale of residential property

== M ==
Maker-checker - Management accounting - Management Assertions - Mark-to-market accounting - Matching principle - Materiality - Money measurement concept - Mortgage loan

== N ==
Negative assurance - Net income - Notes to the Financial Statements - net worth

== O ==
OBERAC - One-for-one checking - Online Accounting - Operating expense - Ownership equity

== P ==
Payroll - Petty cash - Philosophy of Accounting - Preferred stock - P/E ratio - Positive accounting - Positive assurance - PricewaterhouseCoopers - Profit and loss account - Pro-forma amount - Production accounting - Project accounting

== R ==
Retained earnings - Revenue - Revenue recognition

== S ==
Sales journal - Security - Social accounting - Spreadsheet - Statement of changes in equity - Statutory accounting principles - Stock option - Stock split - Share capital - Shareholder - Shareholders' equity - South African Institute of Chartered Accountants - Sunk cost

== T ==
Three lines of defence - Throughput accounting - Trade credit - Treasury stock - Trial balance

== U ==
UK generally accepted accounting principles - Unified Ledger Accounting - U.S. Securities and Exchange Commission - US generally accepted accounting principles - Work sheet - Write off

== See also ==
- Outline of accounting
- Outline of business
- Outline of economics
- Outline of management
- Outline of marketing
- Outline of production
- Index of auditing-related articles
