= John R. McCarl =

American lawyer

John Raymond McCarl
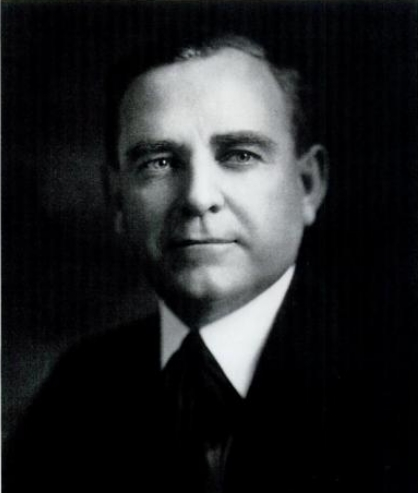

1st Comptroller General of the United States
- In office July 1, 1921 – June 30, 1936
- President: Warren G. Harding; Calvin Coolidge; Herbert Hoover; Franklin D. Roosevelt
- Preceded by: office established
- Succeeded by: Fred H. Brown

Personal details
- Born: November 27, 1879 near Des Moines, Iowa, U.S.
- Died: August 2, 1940 (aged 60) Washington, D.C., U.S.
- Party: Republican
- Spouse: Ethel Barnett McCarl
- Education: University of Nebraska

John Raymond McCarl (November 27, 1879 – August 2, 1940) was an American lawyer and executive secretary of the national Republican Congressional Campaign Committee. He was the first comptroller general of the United States, serving from 1921 to 1936. During his time in office, he was one of the most powerful and controversial officials in the U.S. federal government.

== Early life and career ==
McCarl was born in a log cabin on November 27, 1879, near Des Moines, Iowa. His father was a veteran of the Union Army who fought in the American Civil War. John attended local public schools. McCarl's father died in 1893 at the age of 53.

After her husband's death, Sara McCarl moved John and his five siblings to McCook, Nebraska. John held part-time jobs during the school year, and in the summers worked for the Chicago, Burlington and Quincy Railroad and local lawyer Webster Morlan. He was a halfback on the first football team fielded by McCook High School, and sang in a local vocal quartet.

McCarl graduated from McCook High School in 1897 and entered the University of Nebraska. He received a Bachelor of Laws degree from the University of Nebraska College of Law in 1903. McCarl returned to McCook, where he took up the practice of law. On November 26, 1905, he married Ethel Barnett, daughter of Albert Barnett (a McCook lumber yard owner and one of the wealthiest men in the state).

== Government career ==
=== Congressional aide and GOP activism ===
McCarl was a Progressive Republican and active in party politics. In 1914, Fletcher Merwin resigned as private secretary to progressive Republican Senator George W. Norris (also from the town of McCook). On Merwin's recommendation, McCarl applied for and won the position.

In 1917, Norris opposed American entry into World War I. Worried that Norris would be denied renomination to the United States Senate in 1918, McCarl resigned. Norris was deeply disappointed in McCarl's decision. Senator Simeon D. Fess subsequently appointed McCarl to be secretary of the national Republican Congressional Campaign Committee (which Fess chaired). McCarl was highly active during the 1918 congressional elections, and made numerous political contacts during this time. He continued to work with the committee in the 1920 presidential election, leaving him well-positioned to seek a job with the incoming administration of Warren G. Harding.

=== Comptroller General ===
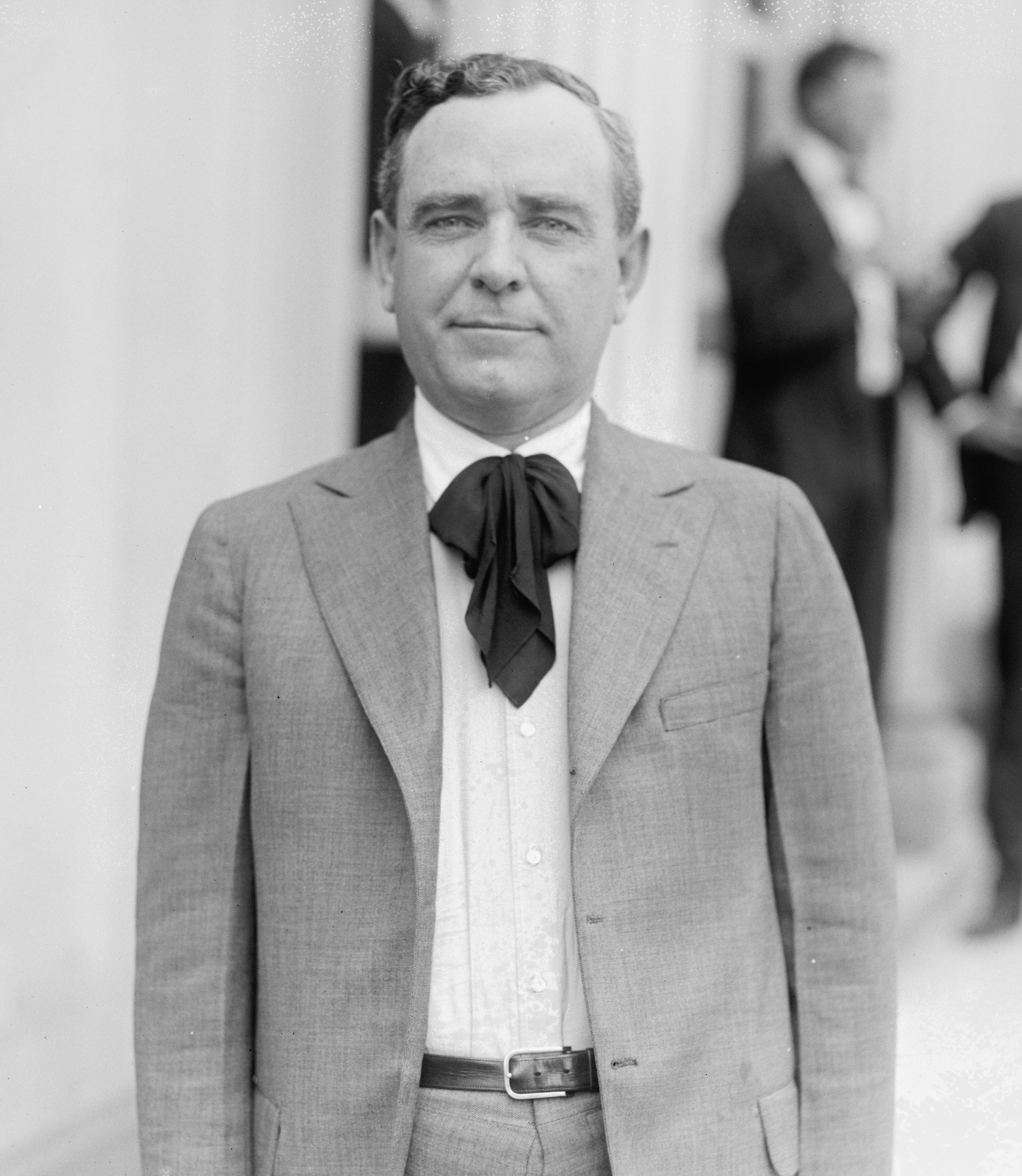
J.R. McCarl in 1921, shortly before his appointment as Comptroller General.

Since the final year of the Taft administration (1912), pressure had been building within the Republican Party for legislation which would impose modern financial accounting and budgeting procedures on the federal government. Worsening national debt due to expenditures required by World War I and a greatly enlarged federal government led to passage of the Budget and Accounting Act of 1921. This legislation, which President Harding signed into law on June 10, 1921, created the Government Accounting Office (GAO), an independent agency answerable solely to Congress. The head of the GAO was the Comptroller General of the United States, a non-partisan position which could only be filled by the President of the United States with the advice and consent of the Senate. The Comptroller General served for a single, non-renewable, 15-year term.

It is unclear how McCarl won appointment as the first Comptroller General of the United States. Some sources say that McCarl advised Harding on who should fill the position, and that Harding chose McCarl. But other sources say that Senator Norris or Senator Fess pushed McCarl for the position. Although McCarl had no financial training or experience whatsoever, Harding nominated McCarl on June 28, 1921, and the Senate confirmed him the next day.

Historians Katie Louchheim and Jonathan Dembo note that McCarl had "virtually unlimited power" during his time in office. He was a decisive leader of the organization, asserted a broad range of powers for himself, and fought strongly to make GAO an impartial and independent agency. McCarl made a wide range of decisions on issues as diverse as individual expense accounts, salary increases, statutory authority to incur expenses, and the right of federal employees to receive reimbursement for their work clothes. He refused to authorize the expenditure of $100 million of Public Works Administration funds for slum clearance and declined to permit the Department of Agriculture to use drought relief funds for the purchase of surplus lambs as a means of price support. He argued that the law simply did not authorize such actions. He once voided contracts for the construction of the $12.5 million Arlington Memorial Bridge because they called for the hiring of a general contractor and not specific individuals, as he believed the law required. (Congress passed legislation changing the law.) His decisions were often highly controversial and he was widely unpopular within the government. He was very critical of the New Deal pushed by President Franklin D. Roosevelt, claiming that New Deal agencies were set up hastily, spent far too much money, and had amorphous powers. He also criticized Congress for delegating too much authority to the executive branch. Political scientist Harvey Mansfield, writing in 1939, considered him a zealot and crusader when it came to accounting.

=== Establishing GAO ===
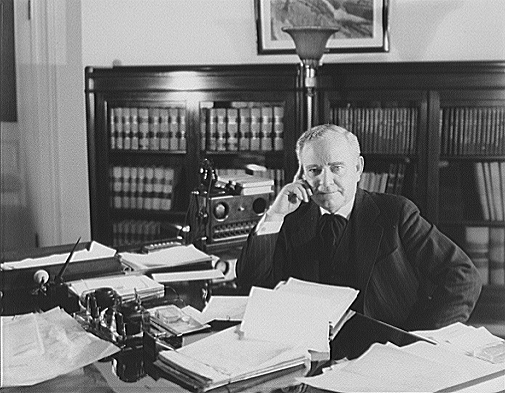
J.R. McCarl at his desk in 1935.

McCarl struggled to make GAO a competent and authoritative agency. In the first six years in office, he strictly controlled work start and stopping times, banned employees from discussing anything which was not work-related, and required employees to stay at their desks. He relaxed these rules significantly in 1927 after realizing they were harming staff morale.

GAO was created out of the office of the Comptroller of the Treasury, and McCarl inherited most of that office's 1,700 workers. He largely retained the Treasury structure, although he concentrated approval authority for communication with Congress in his own office. He also created a legal office, and ordered that any interpretation of law issue only under his own signature. In 1922, he established a Bookkeeping Section to sign off on all government contractual expenditures, a Transportation Division to ensure that shipping costs were reasonable, and an Investigations Section to make investigations and inspections, write reports, and make recommendations regarding the operation and financial procedures of the federal government. This unit (later renamed the Office of Investigations in the late 1920s) quickly became the major arm of GAO.

In 1923, McCarl collapsed five of the GAO's existing divisions into just two, Civil and Military. These two divisions were further consolidated into a single Audit Division in 1926. He established a Records Division the same year. This organizational structure existed largely unchanged until his departure from office (although Bookkeeping was renamed Accounting and Bookkeeping in 1935).

McCall was a constant critic of the lack of a central disbursing authority in the federal government. He believed that having a disbursing agent in each agency or department was a recipe for financial misappropriation. He applauded President Roosevelt's decision on June 10, 1933, to issue Executive Order 6166, which created a Division of Disbursement within the Treasury Department and eliminated this office within each agency.

GAO historian Robert Trask says that McCarl was obstinate and harsh, but the Washington Post at the time of his death called him "mild-mannered".

== Death ==
After retiring as Comptroller General, McCarl practiced law in Washington, D.C. He suffered either a heart attack or a stroke at his desk in his law office on August 2, 1940, and died immediately. His wife, Ethel, survived him. The couple had no children.

John R. McCarl was buried in McCook, Nebraska, at Memorial Park Cemetery.

== Bibliography ==
- Downs, Winfield Scott. Encyclopedia of American Biography. New York: The American Historical Society, 1941.
- Louchheim, Katie and Dembo, Jonathan, eds. The Making of the New Deal: The Insiders Speak. Cambridge, Mass.: Harvard University Press, 1983.
- Lowitt, Richard. George W. Norris: The Making of a Progressive, 1861-1912. Chicago: University of Illinois Press, 1971.
- Mansfield, Harvey C. The Comptroller General: A Study in the Law and Practice of Financial Administration. New Haven, Conn.: Yale University Press, 1939.
- Mosher, Frederick C. The GAO: The Quest for Accountability in American Government. Boulder, Colo.: Westview Press, 1979.
- Sundquist, James. The Decline and Resurgence of Congress. Washington, D.C.: Brookings Institution Press, 1981.
- Tierney, Cornelius E.; Kearney, Edward F.; Fernandez, Roland; and Green, Jeffrey W. Wiley Federal Accounting Handbook: Policies, Standards, Procedures, Practices. Hoboken, N.J.: John Wiley & Sons, 2007.
- Trask, Roger R. Defender of the Public Interest: The General Accounting Office, 1921-1966. Washington, D.C.: U.S. General Accounting Office, 1996.
- Walker, David M. Organizational Transformation: Implementing Chief Operating Officer/Chief Management Officer Positions in Federal Agencies. GAO-08-322T. Washington, D.C.: Government Accountability Office, December 13, 2007.
