= Seven Member Rule =

The Seven Member Rule (House) / Five Member Rule (Senate) in the United States Congress is an important, but seldom used statute that allows members from the legislature's oversight committees to compel offices within the executive branch to release information. This is a "checks and balances" measure to allow effective oversight. In the Senate it is commonly referred as the "rule of five". On September 6, 1966, Congress updated the law. On November 2, 1994, Congress again updated the law.

== Original act ==
Passed in 1921 by the 67th United States Congress, the Budget and Accounting Act (Pub. L. 67–13, 42 Stat. 20, enacted June 10, 1921). The act created the General Accounting Office, now known as Government Accountability Office (GAO). The act gave the congressional the authority to review federal records of federal programs by performing audits and investigations.

== Updates to the act ==
Passed in 1928 by the 70th United States Congress, the law states that:

An Executive agency, on request of the Committee on Government Operations of the House of Representatives, or of any seven members thereof, or on request of the Committee on Governmental Affairs of the Senate, or any five members thereof, shall submit any information requested of it relating to any matter within the jurisdiction of the committee.

— 5 U.S. Code § 2954 - Information to committees of Congress on request

The 89th United States Congress updated the law in 1966. It was passed on September 6, 1966, as Pub. L. 89–554, 80 Stat. 413. Title 5 of the United States Code is a positive law title of the United States Code with the heading "Government Organization And Employees". Prior to the 1966 positive law recodification, Title 5 had the heading, "Executive Departments and Government Officers and Employees." The 103rd United States Congress updated the law in 1994. It was passed on November 2, 1994, as Pub. L. 103–437, 108 Stat. 4581. In 2004, the 108th Congress decided to better reflect the mission of the General Accounting Office, it was changed to the Government Accountability Office (GAO).

== Usage ==
It has been invoked on multiple occasions, including:

- In 1994, Republicans invoked the law during the S&L crisis investigations.
- In 2001, Democrats invoked the law to investigate the 2000 United States census.
- In 2017, House Democrats sued, invoking the law, to compel the General Services Administration to release documents relating to the lease of the government-owned Old Post Office Pavilion to the Trump International Hotel — the source of much controversy.
- In 2025, Senate Democrats invoked the law to seek the release of Justice Department materials related to the investigation of financier and accused sex trafficker Jeffrey Epstein.
