= Gene Dodaro =

Comptroller General of the United States (born 1951)

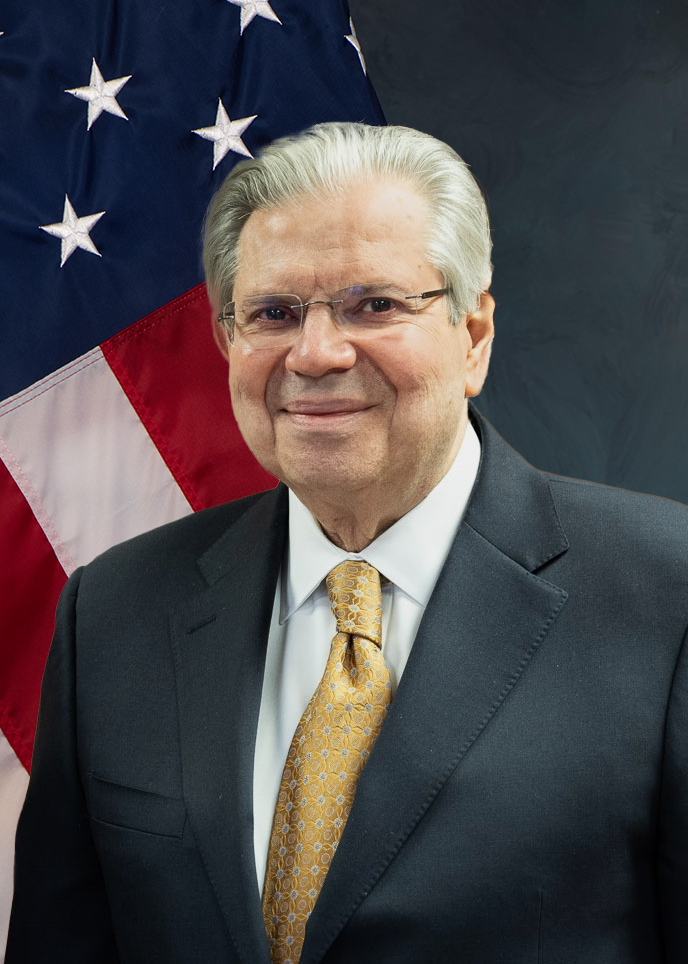
- Official portrait, 2025

8th Comptroller General of the United States
- In office March 13, 2008 – December 30, 2025; Acting: March 13, 2008 – December 30, 2010
- President: George W. Bush; Barack Obama; Donald Trump; Joe Biden; Donald Trump
- Preceded by: David Walker
- Succeeded by: Orice Williams Brown

Personal details
- Born: May 7, 1951 (age 75)
- Spouse: Joan McCabe
- Children: 3
- Education: Lycoming College (BA)

Eugene Louis Dodaro (born May 7, 1951) is an American politician who was the comptroller general of the United States and head of the U.S. Government Accountability Office (GAO) from 2008 to 2025. From October 1, 2000, until March 12, 2008, he was the chief operating officer (COO) of the GAO and he held the equivalent second-in-command title before the late 2000 restructuring of the GAO, principal assistant comptroller general, a title he had held since May 1999. This change of titles is a result of the organization-wide restructuring rather than a promotion or other event in his career; from May 1999 through to March 12, 2008, Dodaro retained the position of second in command of the GAO. Dodaro announced his retirement in 2025 and retired as comptroller general on December 30.

== Early life and education ==
Dodaro is the son of Jim and Betty Dodaro and grew up in the Monessen—Belle Vernon region of Pennsylvania, attending Belle Vernon Area High School, where he played basketball.

Dodaro attended Lycoming College in Williamsport, Pennsylvania, and graduated in 1973 receiving a Bachelor of Arts degree in accounting.

== Career ==
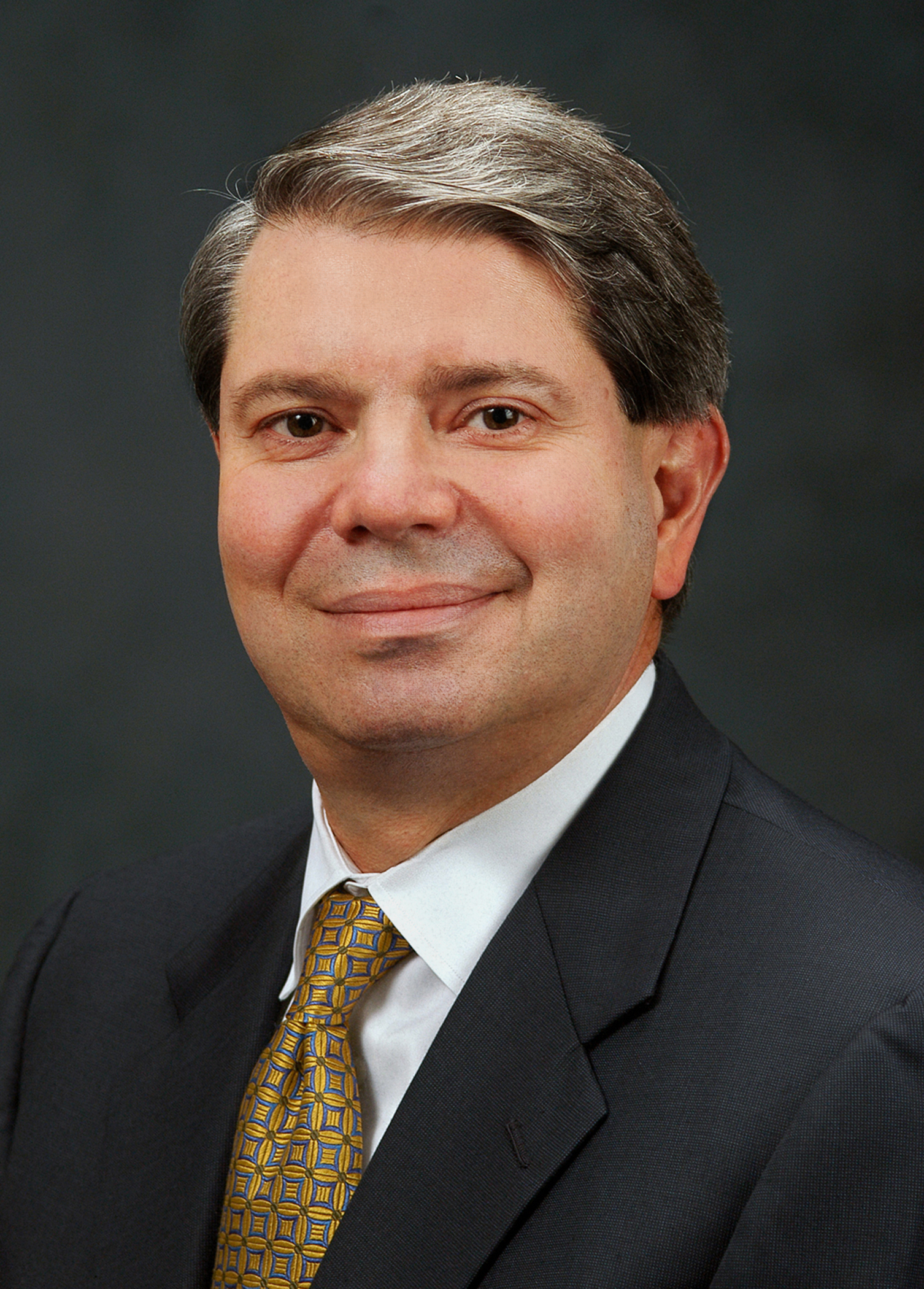
Dodaro in 2005

Dodaro joined the GAO in 1973. His first executive posting was as an associate director for management issues in the General Government Division. In 1993, he was named assistant comptroller general for accounting and information management. In 1999 he became the GAO's second in command.

On February 15, 2008, when the seventh comptroller general of the United States, David M. Walker, announced that he was departing from his office before the end of his 15-year term to work for the Peter G. Peterson Foundation, he appointed Dodaro to replace him. On March 13, 2008, Dodaro became the acting comptroller general and was eventually nominated by President Obama to fill the role permanently. He was confirmed by the U.S. Senate for a term of fifteen years on December 22, 2010. He was sworn in eight days later.

== Awards and honors ==
In 1981 Dodaro received the GAO's Meritorious Service Award. In 1989 he received the Arthur S. Flemming Award for outstanding individual performance in government. In 2001 he became a Fellow of the National Academy of Public Administration and in 2003 was awarded the prestigious National Public Service Award conferred by that organization. In 2009 he received the Roger W. Jones Award for Executive Leadership. In 2025 he was inducted into the Government Executive's Government Hall of Fame. In 2026, he was awarded the "Keeper of the Public Trust Award" during the Celebration of the American Public Servant 250 Gala. In August 2026, he was inducted into The Accounting Hall of Fame as the 125th member at the American Accounting Association's Global Connect in Las Vegas, Nevada. In October 2026, he received the AICPA's Honorary Gold Medal award.

== Personal life ==
Dodaro and his wife, Joan (née McCabe), have three children. They live in Alexandria, Virginia.
