= Roger W. Jones Award for Executive Leadership =

- Awarded for: U.S. Federal government executive leadership
- Sponsored by: American University School of Public Affairs
- Location: Washington, D.C.
- Country: United States
- First award: 1978

Highlights
- Most awards: United States Department of Health and Human Services
- Website: american.edu

List of Roger W. Jones Award for Executive Leadership recipients is a compilation of United States government executives who have received the Jones Award from the American University School of Public Affairs, an institution of higher education and research located in Washington, D.C. that grants academic degrees in fields such as political science, public administration, public policy, and justice, law and society. First awarded in 1978, the award has been presented every year since then to two United States federal career executives who have shown leadership in the training of federal government managers and executives and in organizational abilities.

The awards namesake, Roger W. Jones (1908 – 1993), was a federal civil servant who helped direct the Office of Management and Budget in the 1940s and 1950s. In 1978, Bernard Rosen, a former United States Civil Service Commission executive director, graduate instructor at the American University, and subsequent author of the 1984 book Holding Government Bureaucracies Accountable, helped start American University's Roger W. Jones Award for Executive Leadership in federal government. In 2002, Victor J. Ferlise, United States Army Deputy to the Commanding General, Communications Electronic Command, received the award on September 24, which marked the 25th anniversary of the award.

== Award recipients ==
Sortable table
Year	Recipient	Recipient department when received award	Recipient position when received award	Note
1978	Norman Carlson	United States Department of Justice	Director of the Bureau of Prisons	
1978	Edwin C. Kilgore	National Aeronautics and Space Administration	Director of Management Operation, Langley Research Center	
1979	Christopher C. Kraft	National Aeronautics and Space Administration	Director, Lyndon B. Johnson Space Center	
1979	Dale R. McOmber	Office of Management and Budget	Assistant Director, Budget Review	
1980	Harry S. Havens	General Accounting Office	Assistant Comptroller General for Program Evaluation	
1980	Francis J. Mulhern	United States Department of Agriculture	Administrator of the Animal and Plant Health Inspection Service	
1981	William R. Lucas	National Aeronautics and Space Administration	Marshall Flight Center, Director	
1981	Charles V. Yarbrough	United States Veterans Administration	Director, Management Support	
1982	G. Phillips Hanna	Office of Management and Budget	Deputy Division Chief for Human Resources, Veterans, and Labor	
1982	William C. Watson Jr.	United States Department of Health and Human Services	Deputy Director, Centers for Disease Control	
1983	David O. Cooke	United States Department of Defense	Deputy Assistant Secretary of Defense for Administration	
1983	Joyce J. Walker	Office of Management and Budget	Deputy Associate Director for Transportation, Commerce, and Housing	
1984	Stanley Goldberg	United States Department of the Treasury	Assistant Commissioner, Returns and Information Processing, Internal Revenue Service	
1984	Gerald J. Mossinghoff	United States Postal Service	Assistant Secretary and Commissioner for Patents and Trademarks	
1985	Robert L. Trachtenberg	United States Department of Health and Human Services	Deputy Administrator, Alcohol, Drug Abuse, and Mental Health Administration	
1985	Robert J. Eichelberger	United States Department of the Army	Director, U.S. Army Ballistic Research Laboratory	
1986	William E. Douglas	United States Department of the Treasury	Commissioner, Financial Management Service	
1986	Earle L. Messere	United States Navy	Technical Director, Naval Underwater Systems Center, Newport	
1987	John R. Simpson	United States Department of the Treasury	Director, U.S. Secret Service, and President of INTERPOL	
1987	Milton J. Socolar	General Accounting Office	Special Assistant to the Comptroller General	
1988	Vernon N. Houk	United States Department of Health and Human Services	Director, Center for Environmental Health and Injury Control, Centers for Disease Control	
1988	Raymond G. Kammer	United States Department of Commerce	Deputy Director, National Bureau of Standards	
1989	Joseph R. Caraveo	United States Postal Service	Regional Postmaster General, Western Region	
1989	Richard A. Clarke	United States Department of State	Deputy Assistant Secretary for Regional Affairs, Bureau of Intelligence and Research	
1990	James L. Blum	Congressional Budget Office	Assistant Director for Budget Analysis	
1990	Stephen E. Higgins	United States Department of the Treasury	Director, Bureau of Alcohol, Tobacco, and Firearms	
1991	Thomas S. McFee	United States Department of Health and Human Services	Assistant Secretary for Personnel Administration	
1991	Joseph L. Moore	United States Department of Veterans Affairs	Director, Veterans Affairs Medical Center, Chicago	
1992	Aaron Cohen	National Aeronautics and Space Administration	Director, Lyndon B. Johnson Space Center	
1992	J. Dexter Peach	General Accounting Office	Assistant Comptroller General, Resources, Community, and Economic Development Program	
1993	Walter Dowdle	United States Department of Health and Human Services	Deputy Director, Centers for Disease Control	
1993	Eva C. Ugarkovich	United States Air Force	Director of Financial Management	
1994	James J. Devine	National Security Agency	Deputy Director for Support Services	
1994	Ruth Kirschstein	United States Department of Health and Human Services	Deputy Director, National Institutes of Health	
1995	Joan Dempsey	United States Department of Defense	Director, National Military Intelligence Production Center	
1995	Janet Shikles	General Accounting Office	Assistant Comptroller General for Health, Education, and Human Services	
1996	Frank Almaguer	United States Agency for International Development	Deputy Assistant Administrator for Human Resources	
1996	Nancy George	United States Postal Service	Vice President for the Northeast Area	
1997	John Dyer	Social Security Administration	Acting Principal Deputy Commissioner	
1997	J. Wayne Littles	National Aeronautics and Space Administration	Director, George C. Marshall Space Flight Center	
1998	Virginia S. Bales	United States Department of Health and Human Services	Deputy Director, National Center for Chronic Disease Prevention and Health Promotion, Centers for Disease Control	
1998	William J. Henderson	United States Postal Service	Executive Vice President and Chief Operating Officer	
1999	John E. Sirmalis	United States Navy	Technical Director, Naval Undersea Warfare Center	
1999	Robert S. Winokur	National Oceanic and Atmospheric Administration	Assistant Administrator for Satellite and Information Services	
2000	Charles P. Nemfakos	United States Navy	Deputy Under Secretary for Institutional Strategic Planning	
2000	Janet Woodcock	United States Department of Health and Human Services	Director, Center of Drug Evaluation and Research Food and Drug Administration	
2001	Paul D. Barnes	Social Security Administration	Deputy Commissioner for Human Resources	
2001	Arthur J. Murton	Federal Deposit Insurance Corporation	Director, Division of Insurance	
2002	Victor J. Ferlise	United States Army	Deputy to the Commanding General, Communications Electronic Command	
2002	Kenneth M. Pusateri	Defense Nuclear Facilities Safety Board	General Manager	
2003	Larry G. Massanari	Social Security Administration	Regional Commissioner	
2003	James Randolph Farris	United States Department of Health and Human Services	Centers for Medicare and Medicaid Services, Regional Administrator	
2004	Jennifer C. Buck	United States Department of Defense	Deputy Assistant Secretary of Defense for Reserve Affairs	
2004	Michael J. Zamorski	Federal Deposit Insurance Corporation	Director, Division of Supervision and Consumer Protection	
2005	Sheila M. Earle	Office of the Secretary of Defense	Acting Principal Director for Military Personnel Policy	
2005	Marvin E. Gunn Jr.	United States Department of Energy	Manager of the Office of Science, Chicago Office	
2006	David M. Altwegg	Office of the Secretary of Defense	Deputy for Agency Operations, Missile Defense Agency	
2006	William H. Gimson III	United States Department of Health and Human Services	Chief Operating Officer, Centers for Disease Control and Prevention	
2007	MaryAnn Musumeci	United States Department of Veterans Affairs	Director, James J. Peters Veterans Affairs Medical Center, The Bronx	
2007	John E. Potter	United States Postal Service	Postmaster General and chief executive officer	
2008	Thomas A. Betro	United States Department of the Navy	Director, Naval Criminal Investigative Service	
2008	Theresa M. Whelan	United States Department of Defense	Deputy Assistant Secretary of Defense for African Affairs	
2009	Gene Dodaro	Government Accountability Office	Comptroller General of the United States	
2009	Linda E. Stiff	United States Department of the Treasury	Deputy Commissioner for Services and Enforcement, Internal Revenue Service	
2010	Kenneth E. Baker	United States Department of Energy	Principal Assistant Deputy Administrator, National Nuclear Security Administration, Office of Defense Nuclear Nonproliferation	
2010	Peggy A. Forcarino	United States Department of Commerce	Deputy Commissioner for Patents, U.S. Patent and Trademark Office	
2011	Margaret Gilligan	Federal Aviation Administration	Associate Administrator	
2011	John A. Montgomery	United States Department of the Navy	Director of Research, Naval Research Laboratory	
2012	Thomas L. Mesenbourg Jr.	United States Census Bureau	Acting Director	
2012	David Wennergren	United States Department of Defense	Assistant Deputy Chief Management Officer	
2013	David A. Bray	Federal Communications Commission	Chief Information Officer	
2013	Brian Persons	United States Department of the Navy	Assistant Deputy Chief of Naval Operations for Warfare Systems	

== See also ==
- American University School of Public Affairs
- Roger W. Jones
- List of social sciences awards
