= 2006 New Zealand budget =

- Submitted by: Michael Cullen
- Country: New Zealand
- Parliament: Parliament of New Zealand
- Party: Labour
- Total revenue: $47.4 billion
- Total expenditures: $42.1 billion
- Surplus: $4.2 billion
- Debt: $10 billion (Net); 5.8% (Net debt to GDP)
- Website: http://www.treasury.govt.nz/budget/2006
- ^{ǂ}Numbers in italics are projections.

The New Zealand budget for fiscal year 2006–2007 was presented to the New Zealand House of Representatives by Finance Minister Dr Michael Cullen on 18 May 2006.

This was the seventh budget Michael Cullen has presented as Minister of Finance.

The budget allocated an operating spending of $6 billion and capital of $2.7 billion over the preceding four years.

== Outline ==
Key issues in the budget includes:

- The Telecom New Zealand local loop unbundling.
- $1.3 billion extra for transport.
- $3 billion extra for health care, over the next four years.
- $361 million extra for schooling.
- $166 million extra for tertiary education and skill training.
- $162 million extra for early childhood education.
- While there was some lobbying for tax cuts, none were delivered.
- $8.5 billion OBERAC surplus; $1.5 billion cash surplus

== Reception ==
Cullen's guiding principle was, he stated, "The fool who spends on the upturn will find himself broke on the downturn".

It has been labelled as the "Bondi Budget" by National party leader Dr Don Brash. Brash stated "Helen Clark and Michael Cullen believe there is a place for tax cuts – it's called Australia".
