= Orice Williams Brown =

American politician

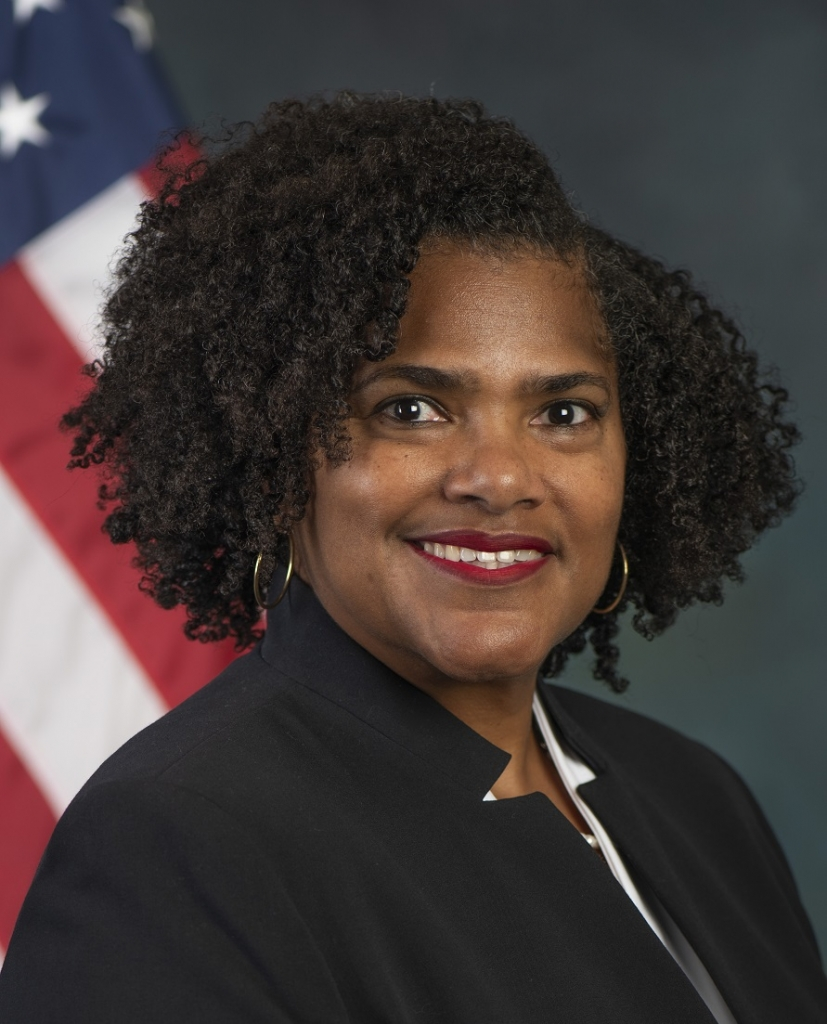

Acting Comptroller General of the United States
- Incumbent
- Assumed office December 30, 2025
- President: Donald Trump
- Preceded by: Gene Dodaro

Personal details
- Born: 1965 or 1966 (age 60–61)
- Education: Virginia Commonwealth University (BA)

Orice Williams Brown a U.S. government official who is Acting Comptroller General of the United States and head of the U.S. Government Accountability Office (GAO) since 2025.

== Education and career ==
Brown is a native of Spotsylvania County, Virginia. She received her Bachelor of Arts degree from Virginia Commonwealth University and a Master of Business Administration in finance from Virginia Tech. After graduating, she intended to work on Wall Street, but a lack of jobs stemming from the aftermath of the 1987 stock market crash caused her to shift to a government career.

She began her GAO career in 1990 as an entry-level evaluator in the General Government Division's financial markets section. She became an assistant director in 1998 and a director in 2005.

Brown was Managing Director in the Financial Markets and Community Investment Team during 2011–2017, where she led a team of 130 staff responsible for oversight of housing, the insurance industry, financial regulation, consumer and investor protection, small business programs, and Treasury's Troubled Asset Relief Program. During the 2007–2009 financial crisis, her team led the production of dozens of reports required by the Dodd–Frank Consumer and Financial Protection Act, and provided recommendations for the crisis. She also served as GAO's lead on the Financial Regulatory Reform and Modernization Working Group created by the International Organization of Supreme Audit Institutions during 2016–2017. She was awarded a Samuel J. Heyman Service to America Medal for Career Achievement in 2013.

She was then Managing Director for Congressional Relations at GAO during 2017–2021, where she oversaw requests from Congress and statutory requirements for reports. She became a National Academy of Public Administration Fellow in 2018.

She later became GAO's Chief Operating Officer, its second seniormost position. She was awarded a Roger W. Jones Award for Executive Leadership in 2023. Orice W. Brown became Acting Comptroller General on December 30, 2025, succeeding Gene L. Dodaro.

== Sources ==
- This article incorporates text from a free content work. Licensed under Public domain. Text taken from Orice W. Brown Biography, GAO.
