= Construction accounting =

Construction accounting is a form of project accounting applied to construction projects. See also production accounting. Construction accounting is a vitally necessary form of accounting, especially when multiple contracts come into play. The construction field uses many terms not used in other forms of accounting, such as "draw" and progress billing. Construction accounting may also need to account for vehicles and equipment, which may or may not be owned by the company as a fixed asset. Construction accounting requires invoicing and vendor payment, more or less as to the amount of business done.

In the United States, the authoritative literature on Construction accounting is AICPA Statement of Position SOP 81-1.

Construction auditing is an important part of construction accounting and deals with expenses - the IRS offers a guide. IRS Construction Audit Guide . The National Association of Construction Auditors recommends this guide.

== Construction costs ==
These are all cost related to the construction process, right from materials, labor costs, consultancy and all management expenses. Construction accounting involves charging construction costs to the applicable contract. Costs fall into three categories. Direct costs are labor, material, and subcontracting costs, land. Indirect costs include indirect labor, supervision, tools, equipment costs, supplies, insurance, and support costs. Selling, general and administrative costs, are generally excluded from contract costs.

== Revenue recognition ==
Construction accounting requires unique revenue recognition rules for contracts in progress.

In most cases, revenue is recognized using the Percentage of Completion Method. Under this method, revenue is recognized using an estimate for the overall anticipated profit for a particular contract multiplied by the estimated percent complete of that contract. This involves the inherent risk of relying upon estimates.

An example of a Percentage of Completion Method:

A construction company has entered into contract to construct a building for $10,000,000. The building was completed in 2020.

                                                                2018               2019                 2020

Contract Price $10,000,000 $10,000,000 $10,000,000 Actual cost to date $2,291,000 $6,146,000 $10,211,000 Estimated cost to complete $5,609,000 $4,210,000 $0 Total estimated cost $7,900,000 $10,356,000 $10,211,000 Estimated gross profit (loss) (actual in 2020) $2,100,000 $(356,000) $(211,000)

Revenue Recognition:

2018: $2,291,000 / $7,900,000 = 29% * $10,000,000 = $2,900,000

2019: $6,146,000 / $10,356,000 = 59% * $10,000,000 - $2,900,000 = $3,000,000

2020: $10,000,000 - $5,900,000 = $4,100,000

Gross Profit:

2018: $2,900,000 - $2,291,000 = $609,000

2019: $(356,000) - $609,000 = $(956,000)

2020: $(211,000) - $(956,000) - $609,000 = $145,000

When using the Percentage of Completion Method you start with the contract price in this example is $10,000,000 for the entire job. The job is to be completed in three years. To record the first years revenue you start with computing the 2018 actual cost to date divided by the total estimated cost to get the percentage of completion for 2018 which is 29% of the job completed in 2018. You than take the 29% multiply by the cost of the job $10,000,000 and you get $2,900,000 of revenue fore 2018. To compute 2019 you take the same steps you take the actual cost to date of $6,146,000 divide it by total estimated cost of $10,356,000 and you get 59%. That is the percentage of the job completed in 2019. Now you take 59% multiply by contract price of $10,000,000 then subtract the previous years revenue of $2,900,000 and 2019 revenue recognized is $3,000,000. For 2020 you take the contract price of $10,000,000 and subtract the total of both previous years revenue which is $5,900,000 to get 2020 completed revenue of $4,100,000. To compute the gross profit for 2018 you take 2018 revenue of $2,900,000 and subtract the actual cost to date of $2,291,000 to get a gross profit of $609,000 for 2018. For 2019 you take the estimated gross profit form the table of $(356,000) subtract the 2018 gross profit total of $609,000 and you get $(956,000) for 2019. 2020 gross profit you take the estimated gross profit from the table of $(211,000) subtract the previous years of $(956,000) and $609,000 and you get $145,000 of gross profit.

Under SOP 81-1, revenue is also allowed to be computed using the Completed Contract Method. Under this method, contract revenues and costs are not recognized until the contract is substantially complete. However, this method is not allowable if the results are significantly different than results using the Percentage of Completion Method. The Completed Contract Method is allowed in circumstances in which reasonable estimates cannot be determined. However, these types of circumstances can be construed as a lack of internal control.
