= David M. Walker (U.S. Comptroller General) =

American civil servant and think tank executive (born 1951)

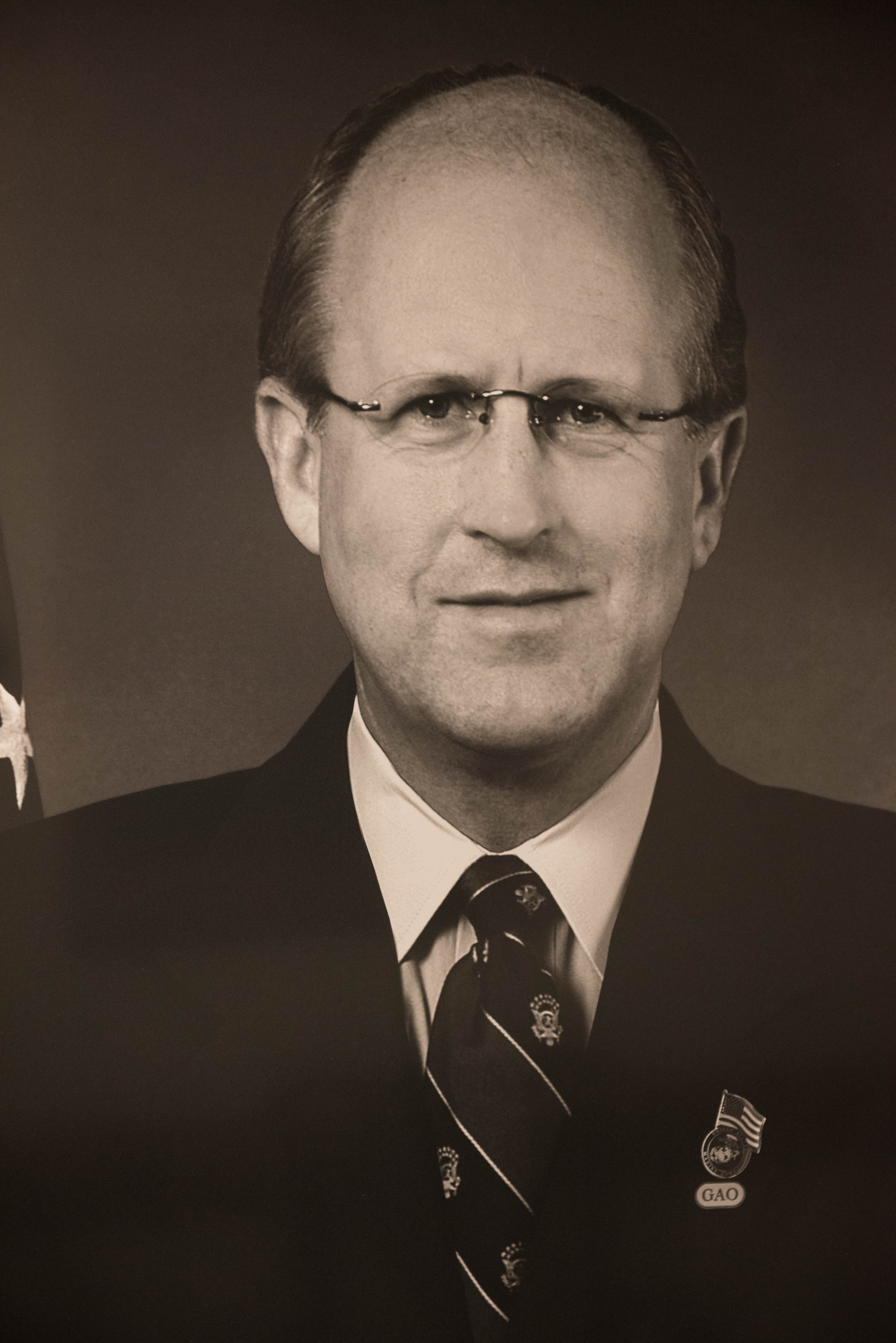

7th Comptroller General of the United States
- In office November 9, 1998 – March 12, 2008
- President: Bill Clinton; George W. Bush
- Preceded by: Charles Bowsher
- Succeeded by: Gene Dodaro

Personal details
- Born: October 2, 1951 (age 75) Birmingham, Alabama, U.S.
- Party: Independent
- Education: Jacksonville University (BS)

David M. Walker (born October 2, 1951) is an American CPA and public servant who served as the comptroller general of the United States from 1998 to 2008, and is founder and CEO of the Comeback America Initiative (CAI) from 2010 to 2013.

In 2017, Walker announced that he would explore running for Governor of Connecticut. He was eliminated from the race on the second round of voting at the State Republican Party Convention in May 2018. He chose not to petition for the ballot consistent with his pledge.

== Early life and education ==
Walker was born in Birmingham, Alabama, in 1951. He received his B.S. in accounting from Jacksonville University, a Senior Management in Government Certificate in public policy from Harvard University's John F. Kennedy School of Government, his first honorary degree from Bryant University, and several other honorary doctorate degrees (American University, Jacksonville University, and Lincoln Memorial University). He is also a Certified Public Accountant and has completed the CAPSTONE program for flag rank military officers.

He worked in human resources at accounting firm Coopers & Lybrand before becoming Houston Director and then Eastern Regional Director of Source Finance. He was subsequently hired by accounting firm Arthur Andersen LLP, rising to become a partner and global managing director. From 1990 to 1995 he was a Public Trustee for Social Security and Medicare, and Assistant Secretary of Labor for Pension and Welfare Benefit Programs.

== Career as Comptroller General ==
David Walker served as Comptroller general of the United States from 1998 to 2008. He began his term when he took his oath of office on November 9, 1998. He was appointed by Bill Clinton. While at the Government Accountability Office (GAO), Walker achieved two pieces of GAO-related legislation, one of which changed the name of the agency from the General Accounting Office to the Government Accountability Office. Walker also embarked on a Fiscal Wake-up Tour in 2006, partnering with the Brookings Institution, the Concord Coalition, and The Heritage Foundation to alert Americans of the country's long-term fiscal imbalance. Labor-management relations became fractious at the end of Walker's nine-plus year tenure as Comptroller general. On September 19, 2007, GAO analysts voted by a margin of two to one (897–445), in a 75% turnout, to establish the first union in GAO's 86-year history. Walker left the GAO to head the Peterson Foundation on March 12, 2008.

== Peter G. Peterson Foundation ==
In 2008 Walker was personally recruited by Peter G. Peterson, co-founder of the Blackstone Group, and former Secretary of Commerce under Richard Nixon, to lead his new foundation. The Foundation distributed the documentary film, I.O.U.S.A., which follows Walker and Robert Bixby, director of the Concord Coalition, around the nation, as they engage Americans in town-hall style meetings. Warren Buffett, Alan Greenspan, Paul Volcker, and Robert Rubin also appear.

Peterson was cited by The New York Times as one of the foremost "philanthropists whose foundations are spending increasing amounts and raising their voices to influence public policy". In philanthropy, Walker has advocated a more action-based approach to the traditional foundation: “I do believe, however, that foundations have been very cautious and somewhat conservative about whether and to what extent they want to get involved in advocacy.” David Walker stepped down as president and CEO of the Peter G. Peterson Foundation on October 15, 2010, to establish his own venture, the Comeback America Initiative.

== Campaign for fiscal responsibility ==
Walker has compared the present-day United States to the Roman Empire in its decline, saying the U.S. government is on a "burning platform" of unsustainable policies and practices with fiscal deficits, expensive overcommitments to government provided health care, swelling Medicare and Social Security costs, the enormous expense of a prospective universal health care system, and overseas military commitments threatening a crisis if action is not taken soon.

Walker has also taken the position that there will be no technological change that will mitigate health care and social security problems into 2050 despite ongoing discoveries.

In the national press, Walker has been a vocal critic of profligate spending at the federal level. In Fortune magazine, in 2008 he warned that "from Washington, we'll need leadership rather than laggardship". In another op-ed in the Financial Times, he argued that the credit crunch could portend a far greater fiscal crisis; and on CNN, he said that the United States is "underwater to the tune of $50 trillion" in long-term obligations.

He compared the thrift of Revolutionary-era Americans, who, if excessively in debt, would "merit time in debtors' prison", with modern times, where "we now have something closer to debtors' pardons, and that's not good".

In the fall of 2012, the Comeback America Initiative led a campaign called the "$10 Million a Minute" Bus Tour. The tour covered about 10,000 miles and stopped at universities, technical colleges, businesses, and more in over a dozen states. The tour's goal was to bring national attention to the economic and fiscal challenges that face our nation and various nonpartisan solutions that should be able to gain bipartisan support.

Along with former Fed Vice Chairman Alice Rivlin, Walker danced the Harlem Shake in a video produced by The Can Kicks Back, a nonpartisan group that attempted to organize millennials to pressure lawmakers to address the United States' then $16.4 trillion debt.

== Other responsibilities ==
Walker serves on the board of the Government Transformation Initiative Coalition. He previously served on various boards and advisory groups, including as Chairman of the United Nations Independent Audit Advisory Committee from 2007 to 2011, as a member of the Boards for the Committee for a Responsible Federal Budget, and the Center for the Study of the Presidency and Congress, as well as a member of Advisory Committees for The Public Company Accounting Oversight Board, the Peterson Foundation, and is a former member of the AARP's National Board and Policy Council. He is also a member of the National Academy for Public Administration, the National Academy of Social Insurance, the Trilateral Commission, and the Sons of the American Revolution. He is a National Co-founder of No Labels previously served as Chair of a Postal Reform Panel for National Academy of Public Administration, and as co-chair of the Institute of Medicine's End of Life Panel.

He has authored four books, including “Comeback America: Turning the Country Around and Restoring Fiscal Responsibility" (2010) and “America in 2040: Still a Superpower” (2020). He is a frequent writer and commentator, and is one of the main subjects of the documentary I.O.U.S.A., which critic Roger Ebert named as one of the Top 5 Documentaries of 2008.

== Lieutenant Governor of Connecticut candidacy ==
In the 2014 election, Walker unsuccessfully sought to become the Republican nominee for Lieutenant Governor of Connecticut. In Connecticut, the candidates for Governor and Lieutenant Governor run separately in the primary elections, but together as a ticket in the general election.

== Governor of Connecticut candidacy ==
On April 9, 2017, Walker announced that he would be establishing an exploratory committee to run for the Republican nomination for governor of Connecticut. Walker pledged to support term limits for the office of governor and said that gubernatorial candidates should run as a ticket, so then voters know who would be their leaders. He withdrew his candidacy on May 14, 2018 following second round ballot results at the Republican state convention. A month later, on June 14, 2018, he endorsed businessman Bob Stefanowski.

== Personal life ==
Walker and his wife Mary live in Alexandria, Virginia, and have two children and three grandchildren.

== Awards ==
Walker received the Gold Medal Award of Distinction from the American Institute of Certified Public Accountants' on October 19, 2008. In 2010 he was inducted into the Accounting Hall of Fame at Ohio State University.

== Books ==
- 1996. Retirement Security: Understanding and Planning Your Financial Future. John Wiley & Sons.
- 1998. Delivering on the Promise: How to Attract, Manage and Retain Human Capital. Free Press.
- 2010. Comeback America: Turning the Country Around and Restoring Fiscal Responsibility. Random House.
- 2020 and 2024. “America in 2040: Still a Superpower? (A Pathway to Success)”. Hon. David M. Walker (Eric Chavez)
