= Marvin Travis Runyon =

American businessman

Marvin Runyon
- Runyon at a House Government Reform and Oversight Committee session in 1997

70th United States Postmaster General
- In office July 6, 1992 – May 16, 1998
- President: George H. W. Bush; Bill Clinton
- Preceded by: Anthony M. Frank
- Succeeded by: William J. Henderson

Personal details
- Born: September 16, 1924 Fort Worth, Texas, U.S.
- Died: October 3, 2004 (aged 80) Nashville, Tennessee, U.S.
- Education: Texas A&M University (BS)

Military service
- Allegiance: United States of America
- Branch/service: United States Army Air Forces
- Years of service: 1943-1945
- Rank: Second lieutenant

Marvin Travis Runyon (September 16, 1924 – October 3, 2004) was an American business executive and civil servant. He had a long career as a manufacturing executive at Ford Motor Company until his retirement, then joined Nissan as head of North American operations. He later served as chairman of the Tennessee Valley Authority (TVA) and as U.S. Postmaster General. He was a forceful and charismatic figure who picked up the nicknames "Marvelous Marv" and "Carvin' Marvin".

== Ford Motor Company ==
Born in Fort Worth, Texas, he graduated from Woodrow Wilson High School (Dallas, Texas) in 1942 and started working for Ford at the now-closed Dallas Assembly Plant in 1943, where his father was also employed. He served in the United States Army Air Forces later during 1943 to 1945 and returned to Ford. After graduation from Texas A&M University in 1948 he began to climb in management, making the rounds through Ford assembly plants in Atlanta, Georgia, and Lorain, Ohio, during the 1950s.

He was a plant manager during the 1960s. He lived in London, Ontario, Canada, where he supervised the opening and staffing of the Talbotville (St. Thomas) assembly plant which begun operations in 1967.

He became an executive at the assembly operations headquarters in 1969 and became assembly division general manager in 1972. From 1973 to 1977 he was vice-president in charge of powertrain and chassis operations, then became vice president in charge of vehicle assembly and body stamping operations in 1978. When he retired at the end of 1980 it was widely rumored that he was going to head all Nissan operations in the United States, but that announcement did not come until several days after he had actually retired.

== Nissan North America ==
In 1981, Runyon became the chief executive of Nissan North America and supervised the construction of its assembly and engine plants in Smyrna, Tennessee. These plants became among the most productive in the auto industry. Despite being a top manager, "Runyon wore the same blue jumpsuit as assemblers and ate lunch alongside them in the company cafeteria", saying that "Erasing the symbolic gap between the assembly line and the executive office was key to building the worker's sense of identification with the company".

When Runyon moved onto the Tennessee Valley Authority in 1988, he was succeeded by another former Ford plant manager, Jerry Benefield. Benefield had been head of the Ford assembly plant in Dearborn, Michigan when he joined Nissan North America as the organization's first vice president of manufacturing at the bequest of Runyon. In July 1989, Benefield successfully defeated a United Auto Workers union drive attempting to organize the Nissan Smyrna plant.

== Tennessee Valley Authority ==
In 1988, Runyon was appointed by President Ronald Reagan to head the Tennessee Valley Authority. TVA, America's largest electric power producer, was struggling with enormous debts from its failing nuclear power program. A creation of the New Deal era, TVA had also been the Congressional dumping ground for a multitude of unrelated Federal programs and projects. TVA managed not only nuclear plants, but ran recreation facilities, tested electric cars, produced fertilizer, and even owned a herd of buffalo—in all, more than 186 separate business units. TVA's electric rates had skyrocketed in past years to pay for uncompleted nuclear plants, and high electric rates were threatening the region's economy.

The nomination process was noted for its hastiness. He received the support of Senator Al Gore Jr and Senator James Sasser, among others, but groups like the Tennessee Valley Authority Board Appointment Coalition felt the process was a "runaway train" and that Runyon had failed to foster partnership with them and the Valley citizens. Runyon was the first presidential appointee since the creation of the TVA Board Appointment Coalition to outright refuse to answer the coalition's questions. Before his appointment, he remained quiet on most issues, stating that he would seek more information if appointed. Runyon and those who supported him argued that his managerial experience at Ford and Nissan USA was more important and relevant than his lack of experience in utilities, hydroelectric energy, or land management.

Runyon, a serious-minded technical manager, believed that TVA's management had too many distractions from TVA's wide-ranging activities, so he ordered non-essential business units closed. Runyon's aggressive cost cutting began with a promise to residential and commercial customers that TVA would not increase rates under his watch. This pledge forced TVA management to reduce costs in order to keep electric rates stable.

Although popular with homeowners and the business community, Runyon's cost-cutting included massive layoffs—more than 7,000 employees were let go on one day alone. The staff reductions earned him the sobriquet "Carvin Marvin" which inspired a satirical song played on local radio stations. Nationally he was celebrated by industry publications. In a Baron's editorial article, his work was lauded: "Three cheers for TVA: privatization could win it a coveted third"

The TVA Runyon left behind was much leaner, more focused, and had begun paying down its massive debt load. Some believe TVA would not have survived without the restructuring Runyon accomplished. But this new TVA was starkly different from the "national laboratory" Carter called on it to become in 1979. The TVA of 1933 run by engineers and bureaucratic experts was handed over to a financial class of managers who gained newfound status in the Reagan era. These managers had an often tenuous relationship with the Authority.

== Postmaster General ==
Runyon was appointed United States Postmaster General in 1992, at a time when the postal service was struggling with high costs and a poor reputation for service.

Runyon's first goal was to treat the United States Postal Service as a business geared toward making money and pleasing customers. He was a cost control expert and instituted cost measurement systems copied from his years with Ford—he even sent senior post office officials to Ford to review their systems. He eliminated 23,000 management jobs, hired more letter carriers and counter employees and emphasized automation to speed mail delivery.

Runyon, during his time at the United States Postal Service, often decided to distance himself from management when he traveled. He normally made it a high priority to visit Postal Service craft employees (letter carriers, clerks, mailhandlers, etc.) in their work areas. It was not uncommon for him to sit alone in the coach section of an airplane, reading fiction.

He stepped down in 1998, the year in which he oversaw the introduction of electronically distributed franks.

== Retirement ==
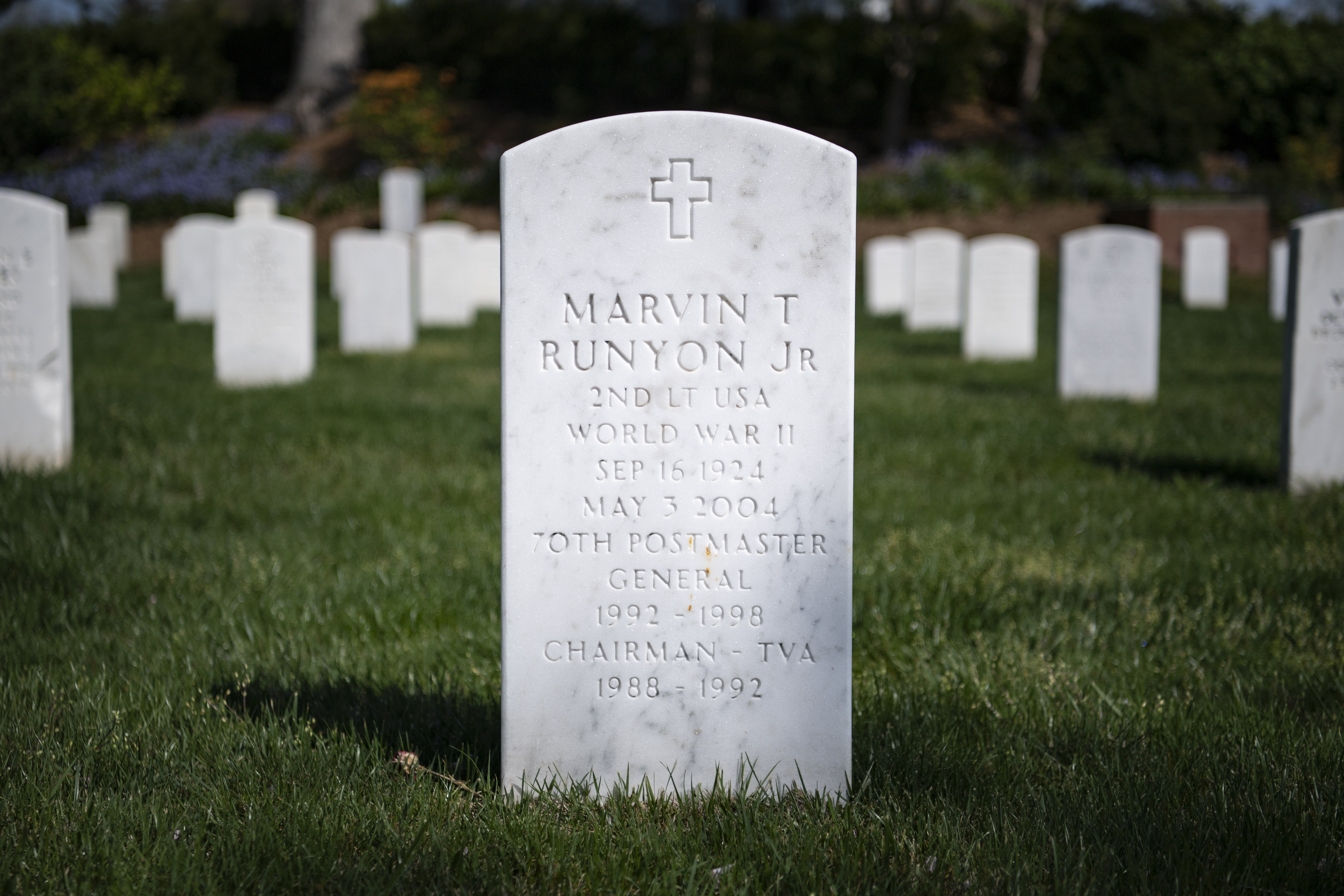
Grave at Arlington National Cemetery

After leaving the United States Postal Service, Runyon started an independent consulting business in Tennessee, which he operated until his death. He also taught business at Middle Tennessee State University. In 1999, he was inducted into Woodrow Wilson High School's Hall of Fame.

Government offices
Preceded by Anthony M. Frank	United States Postmaster General; July 6, 1992 – May 16, 1998	Succeeded by William J. Henderson
