= Positive assurance =

Positive assurance is a concept within accounting ethics, occurring when a certified public accountant (CPA) believes financial statements to be true or correct. Issuing an opinion that the financial statements are presented fairly in conformity with U.S. GAAP is an example of a CPA providing positive assurance. A CPA would provide positive assurance when they believe information is true based on the quality of the work.

When an unmodified audit opinion is given, by definition, the CPA has provided positive assurance because they performed work to prove that financial statements are free from material error.

The corollary is negative assurance, another statement that can be made by a CPA or auditor. Negative assurance is typically given when there is no contradictory evidence to suggest information, like a financial statement, is incorrect. A statement that the CPA was "not aware of any material modifications that should be made to the accompanying interim financial information (statements) for it (them) to be in conformity with accounting principles generally accepted in the United States of America" is a phrase that demonstrates negative assurance. This phrase is often used in review reports.

== See also ==
- Government Accountability Office
- Index of accounting articles
- International Organization of Supreme Audit Institutions
- Legal liability of certified public accountants
