= AICPA Statements of Position =

AICPA Statements of Position (SOPs) are statements of position issued by the American Institute of Certified Public Accountants (AICPA) Standards Division. They are meant to influence the development of accounting standards and to propose revisions to the AICPA's Audit and Accounting Guide (AAGs) series.

The full-text for each SOP is available from the University of Mississippi's Library Digital Collections with the permission of the AICPA. SOPs have been issued since 1974. Those SOPs dealing with accounting standards are superseded by the Financial Accounting Standards Board (FASB).

Audit and Attest SOPs were issued to revise or supplement the AICPA's Audit and Accounting Guides, provide implementation guidance for specific types of audit and attest engagements, and guidance in specialized areas of audit and attest. These SOPs have the same authority as the AAGs.

The full-text in the list below links to reproductions of SOPs as originally issued. Revisions, deletions, and status changes are recorded in the annual AICPA publication Technical Practice Aids which began in 1977.

== List of Statements of Position ==
No.	Official title	Issued on
74-1	Contingencies arising from energy shortages full-text	1974 January 24
74-1	Accounting for research and development and similar costs full-text	1974 February 28
74-2	Disclosure in annual stockholder reports; comments on Securities Exchange Act release no. 10591 full-text	1974 March 7
74-3	Reporting the effects of general price-level changes in financial statements full-text	1974 April 5
74-4	Accounting for future losses full-text	1974 April 25
74-5	Accounting for foreign currency translation, May 17, 1974 full-text	1974 April 25
74-6	Recognition of profit on sales of receivables with recourse full-text	1974 June 14
74-8	Financial accounting and reporting by colleges and universities full-text	1974 August 31
74-9	Conceptual framework for accounting and reporting full-text	1974 August 31
74-10	Accounting for leases full-text	1974 October 11
74-11	Financial accounting and reporting by face-amount certificate companies full-text	1974 December 10
74-12	Accounting practices in the mortgage banking industry full-text	1974 December 30
75-1	Revenue recognition when right of return exists full-text	1975
75-2	Accounting practices of real estate investment trusts full-text	1975 June 27
75-3	Accrual of revenues and expenditures by state and local governmental units full-text	1975 July 31
75-4	Presentation and disclosure of financial forecasts full-text	1975 August
75-5	Accounting practices in the broadcasting industry full-text	1975 December 29
75-6	Questions concerning profit recognition on sales of real estate full-text	1975 December 29
76-1	Accounting practices in the record and music industry full-text	1976 August 25
76-2	Accounting for origination costs and loan and commitment fees in the mortgage banking industry full-text	1976 August 25
76-3	Accounting practices for certain Employee Stock Ownership Plans full-text	1976 December 20
77-1	Financial accounting and reporting by investment companies, April 15, 1977 full-text	1977 April 15
77-2	Accounting for interfund transfers of state and local government units full-text	1977 September 1
78-1	Accounting by hospitals for certain marketable equity securities full-text	1978 May 1
78-2	Accounting practices of real estate investment trusts : proposal to Financial Accounting Standards Board to amend Statement of position 75-2 full-text	1978 May 12
78-3	Accounting for costs to sell and rent, and initial rental operations of, real estate projects full-text	1978 June 30
78-4	Application of the deposit, installment, and cost recovery methods in accounting for sales of real estate full-text	1978 June 30
78-5	Accounting for advance refundings of tax-exempt debt, June 30, 1978 full-text	1978 June 30
78-6	Accounting for property and liability insurance companies; proposal to the Financial Accounting Standards Board to amend AICPA industry audit guide, Audits of fire and casualty insurance companies full-text	1978 July 28
78-7	Financial accounting and reporting by hospitals operated by a governmental unit, July 31, 1978; proposal to the Financial Accounting Standards Board to amend AICPA industry audit guide, Audits of state and local governmental units full-text	1978 July 31
78-8	Accounting for product financing arrangements, Dec. 26, 1978 full-text	1978 December 26
78-9	Accounting for investments in real estate ventures, December 29, 1978 full-text	1978 December 29
78-10	Accounting principles and reporting practices for certain nonprofit organizations full-text	1978 December 31
79-1	Accounting for municipal bond funds; proposal to the Financial Accounting Standards Board to amend AICPA industry audit guide, Audits of investment companies full-text	1979 January 15
79-2	Accounting by cable television companies full-text	1979 March 12
79-3	Accounting for investments of stock life insurance companies; proposal to the Financial Accounting Standards Board to amend AICPA industry audit guide: Audits of stock life insurance companies full-text	1979 March 23
79-4	Accounting for motion picture films; proposal to the Financial Accounting Standards Board to amend AICPA industry accounting guide Accounting for motion picture films full-text	1979 March 26
80-1	Accounting for title insurance companies full-text	1980 January 31
80-2	Accounting and financial reporting by governmental units; amendment to AICPA Industry audit guide, Audits of state and local governmental units full-text	1980 June 30
80-3	Accounting for real estate acquisition, development, and construction costs full-text	1980 December 22
81-1	Accounting for performance of construction-type and certain production-type contracts full-text	1981 July 15
81-2	Reporting practices concerning hospital-related organizations; August 1, 1981 : proposal to the Financial Accounting Standards Board to amend AICPA Industry audit guide, "Hospital audit guide." full-text	1981 August 1
82-1	Accounting and financial reporting for personal financial statements; an amendment to AICPA industry audit guide, Audits of personal financial statements full-text	1982 October 1
83-1	Reporting by banks of investment securities gains or losses, December 31, 1983; amendment to AICPA industry audit guide Audits of banks full-text	1983 December 31
85-1	Financial reporting by not-for-profit health care entities for tax-exempt debt and certain funds whose use is limited; amendment to AICPA industry audit guide, Hospital audit guide full-text	1985 January 1
85-2	Accounting for dollar repurchase, dollar reverse repurchase agreements by sellers-borrowers; amendment to AICPA audit and accounting guide, Savings and loan associations full-text	1985 January 1
85-3	Accounting by agricultural producers and agricultural cooperatives full-text	1985 April 30
86-1	Reporting repurchase-reverse repurchase agreements and mortgage-backed certificates by savings and loan associations; amendment to AICPA audit and accounting guide, Savings and loan associations full-text	1986 September 30
87-1	Accounting for asserted and unasserted medical malpractice claims of health care providers and related issues [full-text]	1987 March 16
87-2	Accounting for joint costs of informational materials and activities of not-for-profit organizations that include a fund-raising appeal full-text	1987 August 21
88-1	Accounting for developmental and preoperating costs, purchases, and exchanges of take-off and landing slots, and airframe modifications; September 30, 1988, amendment to AICPA industry audit guide, Audits of airlines full-text	1988 September 30
88-2	Illustrative auditor's reports on financial statements of employee benefit plans comporting with statement on auditing standards no. 58, reports on audited financial statements, December 15, 1988 full-text	1988 December 15
89-1	Reports on audited financial statements of brokers and dealers in securities; amendment to AICPA audit and accounting guide Audits of brokers and dealers in securities full-text	1989 January
89-2	Reports on audited financial statements of investment companies : amendment to AICPA audit and accounting guide Audits of investment companies full-text	1989 January
89-3	Questions concerning accountants' services on prospective financial statements full-text	1989 April 25
89-4	Reports on the internal control structure in audits of brokers and dealers in securities full-text	1989 April 27
89-5	Financial accounting and reporting by providers of prepaid health care services full-text	1989 May 8
89-6	Auditor's reports in audits of state and local governmental units; August 11, 1989, amendment to AICPA audit and accounting guide Audits of state and local governmental units full-text	1989 August 11
89-7	Report on the internal control structure in audits of investment companies; December 29, 1989, Amendment to AICPA Audit and Accounting Guide Audits of Investment Companies full-text	1989 December 29
90-1	Accountants' services on prospective financial statements for internal use only and partial presentations full-text	1990 January 5
90-2	Report on the internal control structure in audits of futures commission merchants; February 12, 1990, amendment to AICPA audit and accounting guide, Audits of brokers and dealers in securities full-text	1990 February 12
90-3	Definition of the term substantially the same for holders of debt instruments, as used in certain audit guides and a statement of position; February 13, 1990, amendment to AICPA industry audit guide, Audits of banks and AICPA audit and accounting guides Audits of brokers and dealers in securities and Savings and loan associations full-text	1990 February 13
90-4	Auditors' reports under U.S. Department of Housing and Urban Development's Audit guide for mortgagors having HUD insured or Secretary held multifamily mortgages full-text	1990 February 23
90-5	Inquiries of representatives of financial institution regulatory agencies, August 31, 1990; amendment to AICPA industry audit guide, Audits of banks, AICPA audit and accounting guide, Audits of credit unions, and AICPA audit and accounting guide, Savings and loan associations full-text	1990 August 31
90-6	Directors' examinations of banks, September 17, 1990; amendment to AICPA industry audit guide, Audits of Banks full-text	1990 September 17
90-7	Financial reporting by entities in reorganization under the bankruptcy code full-text	1990 November 19
90-8	Financial accounting and reporting by continuing care retirement communities, November 28, 1990; amendment to AICPA audit and accounting guide Audits of providers of health care services full-text	1990 November 28
90-9	Auditor's consideration of the internal control structure used in administering federal financial assistance programs under the Single Audit Act, November 28, 1990; amendment to AICPA audit and accounting guide, Audits of state and local governmental units, and supersession of SOP 89-6, example 26 full-text	1990 November 28
90-10	Reports on audited financial statements of property and liability insurance companies, November 30, 1990; amendment to AICPA audit and accounting guide Audits of property and liability insurance companies full-text	1990 November 30
90-11	Disclosure of certain information by financial institutions about debt securities held as assets, November 30, 1990; amendment to AICPA audit and accounting guides Audits of banks, Audits of credit unions, Audits of finance companies (including independent and captive financing activities of other companies), Audits of property and liability insurance companies, Savings and loan associations, and Audits of stock life insurance companies full-text	1990 November 30
91-1	Software revenue recognition full-text	1991 December 12
92-1	Accounting for real estate syndication income full-text	1992 February 6
92-2	Questions and answers on the term reasonably objective basis and other issues affecting prospective financial statements, February 10, 1992; amendment to AICPA Guide for prospective financial statements full-text	1992 February 10
92-3	Accounting for foreclosed assets full-text	1992 April 28
92-4	Auditing insurance entities' loss reserves, May 29, 1992; supplement to AICPA Audit and accounting guide, Audits of property and liability insurance companies full-text	1992 May 29
92-5	Accounting for foreign property and liability reinsurance, June 1, 1992; supplement to AICPA Audit and accounting guide : Audits of property and liability insurance companies full-text	1992 June 1
92-6	Accounting and reporting by health and welfare benefit plans, August 3, 1992; amendment to AICPA audit and accounting guide, Audit of employee benefit plans full-text	1992 August 3
92-7	Audits of state and local governmental entities receiving federal financial assistance; supplement to AICPA Audit and accounting guide, Audits of state and local governmental units full-text	1992 September 23
92-8	Auditing property/casualty insurance entities' statutory financial statements; applying certain requirements of the NAIC annual statement instructions full-text	1992 October 26
92-9	Audits of not-for-profit organizations receiving federal awards; amendment to AICPA audit and accounting guides, Audits of providers of health care services, Audits of voluntary health and welfare organizations, Audits of colleges and universities, and Audits of certain nonprofit organizations full-text	1992 December 28
92-9 revision	Audits of not-for-profit organizations receiving federal awards, with conforming changes as of December 18, 1995, resulting from the issuance of Government auditing standards: 1994 revision, and Statement on auditing standards no. 74, Compliance auditing considerations in audits of governmental entities and recipients of governmental financial assistance full-text	1995 December 18
93-1	Financial accounting and reporting for high-yield debt securities by investment companies, January 28, 1993; amendment to AICPA Audit and accounting guide, Audits of investment companies full-text	1993 January 28
93-2	Determination, disclosure, and financial statement presentation of income, capital gain, and return of capital distributions by investment companies, February 1, 1993; amendment to AICPA audit and accounting guide, Audits of investment companies full-text	1993 February 1
93-3	Rescission of Accounting Principles Board statements full-text	1993 February 1
93-4	Foreign currency accounting and financial statement presentation for investment companies, April 22, 1993; amendment to AICPA Audit and accounting guide, Audits of investment companies full-text	1993 April 22
93-5	Reporting on required supplementary information accompanying compiled or reviewed financial statements of common interest realty associations, April 23, 1993; amendment to AICPA audit and accounting guide, Common interest realty associations full-text	1993 April 23
93-6	Employers' accounting for employee stock ownership plans full-text	1993 November 22
93-7	Reporting on advertising costs full-text	1993 December 29
93-8	Auditor's consideration of regulatory risk-based capital for life insurance enterprises full-text	1993 December 29
94-1	Inquiries of state insurance regulators; amendment to AICPA Audit and accounting guide Audits of property and liability insurance companies and AICPA industry audit guide Audits of stock life insurance companies full-text	1994 April 20
94-2	Application of the requirements of accounting research bulletins, opinions of the Accounting Principles Board, and statements and interpretations of the Financial Accounting Standards Board to not-for-profit organizations full-text	1994 September 2
94-3	Reporting of related entities by not-for-profit organizations; amendment to AICPA industry audit guides, Audits of voluntary health and welfare organizations and Audits of colleges and universities, AICPA audit and accounting guide, Audits of certain nonprofit organizations, and SOP 78-10, Accounting principles and reporting practices for certain nonprofit organizations full-text	1994 September 2
94-4	Reporting of investment contracts held by health and welfare benefit plans and defined-contribution pension plans, September 23, 1994; amendment to AICPA Audit and accounting guide, Audits of employee benefit plans, and SOP 92-6, Accounting and reporting by health and welfare benefit plans full-text	1994 September 23
94-5	Disclosures of certain matters in the financial statements of insurance enterprises full-text	1994 December 15
94-6	Disclosure of certain significant risks and uncertainties full-text	1994 December 30
95-1	Accounting for certain insurance activities of mutual life insurance enterprises full-text	1995 January 18
95-2	Financial reporting by nonpublic investment partnerships full-text	1995 May 19
95-3	Accounting for certain distribution costs of investment companies; amendment to AICPA audit and accounting guide, Audit of investment companies full-text	1995 July 28
95-4	Letters for state insurance regulators to comply with the NAIC Model Audit Rule full-text	1995 November 3
95-5	Auditor's reporting on statutory financial statements of insurance enterprises; supersedes Statement of position 90-10, Reports on audited financial statements of property and liability insurance companies, and amends AICPA audit and accounting guide, Audits of property and liability insurance companies, and AICPA industry audit guide, Audits of stock life insurance companies full-text	1995 December 21
96-1	Environmental remediation liabilities, including auditing guidance full-text	1996 October 10
97-1	Accounting by participating mortgage loan borrowers full-text	1997 May 9
97-2	Software revenue recognition full-text	1997 October 27
97-3	Accounting by insurance and other enterprises for insurance-related assessments full-text	1997 December 10
98-1	Accounting for the costs of computer software developed or obtained for internal use full-text	1998 March 4
98-2	Accounting for costs of activities of not-for-profit organizations and state and local governmental entities that include fund raising; amendment to AICPA audit and accounting guides Health care organizations, Not-for-profit organizations, and Audits of state and local governmental units full-text	1998 March 11
98-3	Audits of states, local governments, and not-for-profit organizations receiving federal awards full-text	1998 March 17
98-4	Deferral of the effective date of a provision of SOP 97-2, Software revenue recognition full-text	1998 March 31
98-5	Reporting on the costs of start-up activities full-text	1998 April 3
98-6	Reporting on management's assessment pursuant to the life insurance ethical market conduct program of the Insurance Marketplace Standards Association full-text	1998 April 9
98-7	Deposit accounting : accounting for insurance and reinsurance contracts that do not transfer insurance risk full-text	1998 October 19
98-8	Engagements to perform year 2000 agreed-upon procedures attestation engagements pursuant to rule 17a-5 of the Securities Exchange Act of 1934, rule 17Ad-18 of the Securities Exchange Act of 1934, and advisories no. 17-98 and no. 40-98 of the Commodity Futures Trading Commission full-text	1998 November 16
98-9	Modification of SOP 97-2, Software revenue recognition, with respect to certain transactions full-text	1998 December 22
99-1	Guidance to practitioners in conducting and reporting on an agreed-upon procedures engagement to assist management in evaluating the effectiveness of its corporate compliance program full-text	1999 May 21
99-2	Accounting for and reporting of postretirement medical benefit (401(h)) features of defined benefit pension plans; amendment to the AICPA audit and accounting guide, Audits of employee benefit plans full-text	1999 July 28
99-3	Accounting for and reporting of certain defined contribution plan investments and other disclosure matters; amendment to the AICPA audit and accounting guide, Audits of employee benefit plans full-text	1999 September 15
00-1	Auditing health care third-party revenues and related receivables full-text	2000 March 10
00-2	Accounting by producers or distributors of films full-text	2000 June 12
00-3	Accounting by insurance enterprises for demutualizations and formations of mutual insurance holding companies and for certain long-duration participating contracts full-text	2000 December 15
01-1	Amendment to scope of Statement of position 95-2, Financial reporting by nonpublic investment partnerships, to include commodity pools full-text	2001 March 27
01-2	Accounting and reporting by health and welfare benefit plans; amendment to AICPA audit and accounting guide, Audits of employee benefit plans, and SOP 92-6, Accounting and reporting by health and welfare benefit plans full-text	2001 April 20
01-3	Performing agreed-upon procedures engagements that address internal control over derivative transactions by the New York State insurance law full-text	2001 June 15
01-4	Reporting pursuant to the Association for Investment Management and Research performance presentation standards full-text	2001 November 13
01-5	Amendments to specific AICPA pronouncements for changes related to the NAIC codification full-text	2001 December 14
01-6	Accounting by certain entities (including entities with trade receivables) that lend to or finance the activities of others full-text	2001 December 26
02-1	Performing agreed-upon procedures engagements that address annual claims prompt payment reports as required by the New Jersey Administrative Code full-text	2002 May 23
02-2	Accounting for derivative instruments and hedging activities by not-for-profit health care organizations, and clarification of the performance indicator full-text	2002 December 27
03-1	Accounting and reporting by insurance enterprises for certain nontraditional long-duration insurance contracts and for separate accounts full-text	2003 July 7
03-2	Attest engagements on greenhouse gas emissions information full-text	2003 September 22
03-3	Accounting for certain loans or debt securities acquired in a transfer full-text	2003 December 12
03-4	Reporting financial highlights and schedule of investments by nonregistered investment partnerships : an amendment to the audit and accounting guide audits of investment companies and AICPA statement of position 95-2, financial reporting by nonpublic investment partnerships full-text	2003 December 29
03-5	Financial highlights of separate accounts : an amendment to the audit and accounting guide audits of investment companies full-text	2003 December 29
04-1	Auditing the statement of social insurance full-text	2004 November 22
04-2	Accounting for real estate time-sharing transactions full-text	2004 December 9
05-1	Accounting by insurance enterprises for deferred acquisition costs in connection with modifications or exchanges of insurance contracts full-test	2005 September 19
06-1	Reporting pursuant to the Global Investment Performance Standards full-text	2006 April 6
07-1	Clarification of the scope of the audit and accounting guide investment companies and accounting by parent companies and equity method investor for investments in investment companies	2007 June 11
09-1	Performing agreed-upon procedures engagements that address the completeness, accuracy, or consistency of XBRL-tagged data full-text	2009 April
12-1	Reporting pursuant to the Global Investment Performance Standards	2012 October
13-1	Attest engagements on greenhouse gas emissions information	2013 April
13-2	Performing agreed-upon procedures engagements that address the completeness, mapping, consistency, or structure of XBRL-formatted information	2013 September
