= Comfort letter =

Document assuring a company's financial soundness

A comfort letter is a document prepared by an accounting firm assuring the financial soundness or backing of a company. The comfort letter can be issued by a Certified Public Accountant declaring no indication of false or misleading information in the financial statements and that the company's prospectus follows the prevailing accounting standards. This is sometimes used in connection with an initial public offering. Comfort letters are also sometimes provided by those involved in evaluating a company's assets, for instance, in the case of oil and gas companies, third-party reserve engineering firms.

A comfort letter may also be used as written assurance by a subsidiary's parent company or bank used to offer 'comfort' to the buyer as to the seller's ability or willingness to perform its obligations. Comfort letters are often used because the seller is unable or unwilling to provide a guarantee on a certain outcome, such as the performance of a security.

Comfort letters are typically signed prior to the pricing decision or closing date for a given public offering or other transaction, as a part of the due diligence process. Subsequently, a "bring-down" letter is used to re-verify, as of a later date, that the original comfort letter is still valid.

== Antitrust usage ==
The European Commission also adopted a practice of issuing ad hoc written "comfort letters" in its Temporary Framework for assessing antitrust issues related to business cooperation in response to situations of urgency stemming from the current COVID-19 outbreak published in April 2020. The first such "comfort letter" was issued to "Medicines for Europe" and related to an agreement designed to facilitate cooperation in increasing the supply and improving the distribution of medicines.

== See also ==
- Letter of credit
- Financial audit
- Negative assurance
