= William J. Henderson =

American politician (born 1947)

William Henderson
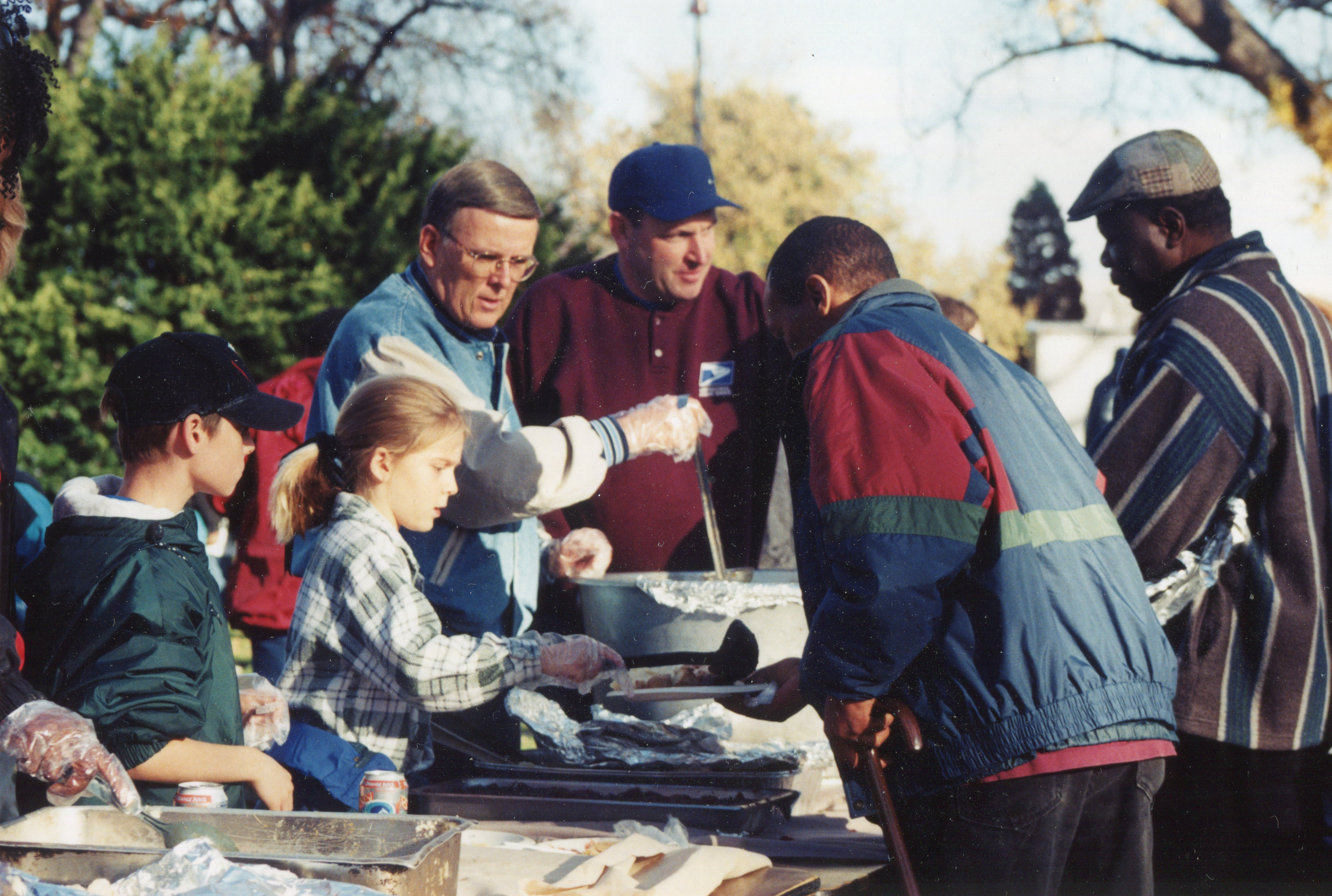
- Henderson (center) serving Thanksgiving dinner to the homeless with Byron Dorgan (1998)

71st United States Postmaster General
- In office May 16, 1998 – May 31, 2001
- President: Bill Clinton; George W. Bush
- Preceded by: Marvin Travis Runyon
- Succeeded by: John E. Potter

Personal details
- Born: June 16, 1947 (age 78)
- Education: University of North Carolina at Chapel Hill (BS)

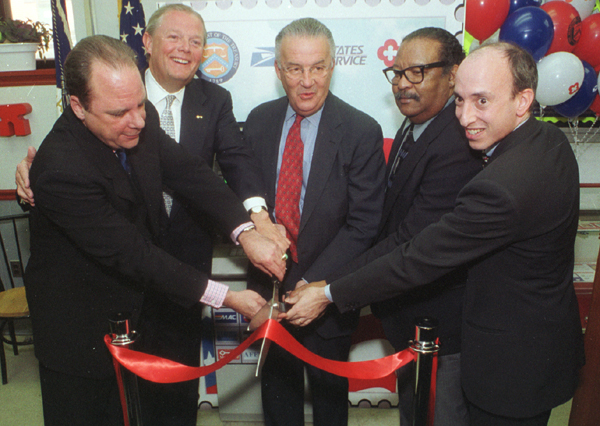
Henderson (left) at a ribbon cutting ceremony to announce ATMs in post offices (1999)

William J. Henderson (born June 16, 1947) served as the United States Postmaster General from 1998 to 2001.

== Education ==
Henderson graduated with a degree in industrial relations from University of North Carolina at Chapel Hill.

== Career ==
Henderson served in the U.S. Army.

After many years of rising through the ranks of the United States Postal Service, Henderson was appointed as the United States Postmaster General by the Governors of the U.S. Postal Service, effective May 16, 1998. He was the fifth career employee to lead the world's largest postal system. On May 31, 2001, Henderson's contract as the United States Postmaster General expired and he stepped down.

In January 2006, Henderson became the chief operations officer at Netflix.

Henderson is a director of LiveRamp. His total 2010 remuneration for this role was $100,000.

In 2011, Henderson founded Hold The Eye Images, Inc.

== Awards ==
- 1997 John Wanamaker Award from USPS.
- 1998 Roger W. Jones Award from American University.
- 1998 Honorary Mailing Excellence Award from National Postal Forum.
- 2000 elected as a fellow of the National Academy of Public Administration.

== Personal life ==
Henderson enjoys photography.

Government offices
Preceded by Marvin T. Runyon	United States Postmaster General; May 16, 1998 – June 1, 2001	Succeeded by John E. Potter
