= Roger W. Jones =

American government official (1908–1993)

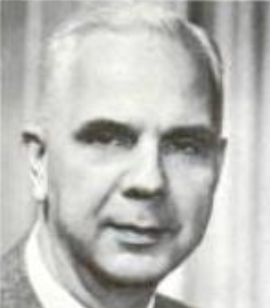
- Roger W. Jones, from a 1963 publication of the United States federal government
- Born: February 3, 1908; New Hartford, Connecticut
- Died: May 28, 1993 (aged 85); Torrington, Connecticut
- Occupation: Career Public Service member
- Title: State Department's Deputy Secretary for Administration, Chairman of the Civil Service Commission
- Spouse: Dorothy Heyl
- Children: Three
- Awards: President's Award for Distinguished Federal Civilian Service (1958)
- Website: Roger-Jones-Award.cfm

Roger W. Jones (February 3, 1908 – May 28, 1993) was a United States government official who served seven United States Presidents in various capacities, including Deputy Secretary of State under President John F. Kennedy. During his 43 years of service in the United States federal government, he also served as deputy director of the Office of Management and Budget and Chairman of the Civil Service Commission, and was awarded the President's Award for Distinguished Federal Civilian Service and the National Civil Service Reform League Award.

== Early life ==
Roger W. Jones was born February 3, 1908, in New Hartford, Connecticut. He graduated from Cornell University in 1928 at the age of 20, where he was a member of the Quill and Dagger society, and he received a master's degree in English from Columbia University in 1931. While attending Columbia, Jones married Dorothy Heyl on February 1, 1930, with whom he later had three children.

== Career ==
In 1933, the family moved to Washington, D.C. and Jones began working at the former Central Statistics Bureau that later became the Budget Bureau, a predecessor to the Office of Management and Budget.

During World War II (1939-1945), Jones served in the United States Army and was assigned to the Combined Chiefs of Staff, the supreme military staff for the Western Allies during World War II. He retired from the army as a full colonel, and received the Legion of Merit and Order of the British Empire. After the war, Jones returned to career public service and rose to be Deputy Director of the Budget Bureau in 1958 under President Dwight D. Eisenhower. In 1959, President Eisenhower named Jones to head the Civil Service Commission, the predecessor of the Office of Personnel Management.

In January 1961, President-elect John F. Kennedy chose Jones to be the State Department's Deputy Secretary for Administration. Jones left the State Department in 1962 and moved back to the Budget Bureau. He retired eight years later in 1968 at the age of 60, but was called back to duty at the bureau a year later in 1969 by President Richard M. Nixon to be the person in charge of developing personnel policies. He retired again in 1975 and moved back to his childhood home town of New Hartford. Jones died at age 85 in 1993 in Torrington, Connecticut.

=== Other service ===
Mr. Jones served on the governing boards of the American Red Cross and the National Institute of Public Affairs, and was a senior fellow at Princeton University's Woodrow Wilson School. American University issues two Roger W. Jones Awards each year in recognition of outstanding public service by career Senior Executive Service federal employees.

== Roger W. Jones Award for Executive Leadership ==
The American University's School of Public Affairs annually awards the Roger W. Jones Award for Executive Leadership to "public servants in the federal government whose careers are marked by extraordinary effectiveness in organizational development".
