= Office of the Auditor General (Botswana) =

Office of the Auditor General is an independent office established to audit government bodies and report on their management of allocated funds. The current Auditor General is Pulane Letebele.

== Roles ==
The role of the Auditor General is to:

- Within six months after the end of each financial year, the Auditor-General shall audit and report, in respect of that financial year, on:
- Accounts of the national and local governments
- Accounts of all funds and authorities of the national and county governments;
- Accounts of all courts
- Accounts of every commission and independent office established by the Constitution
- the accounts of the National Assembly
- The public debt
- Accounts of any other entity that legislation requires the Auditor General to audit.
- The Auditor General may audit and report on the accounts of any entity that is funded from public funds.

== Reports ==
The Auditor-General is mandated to do the following through the audit reports:

- An audit report shall confirm whether or not public money has been applied lawfully and in an effective way.
- Audit reports shall be submitted to Parliament or the relevant county assembly
- Within three months after receiving an audit report, Parliament or the county assembly shall debate and consider the report and take appropriate action.
