= E-accounting =

Application of online and Internet technologies to the business accounting function

E-accounting (or online accounting) is the application of online and Internet technologies to the business accounting function. Similar to e-mail being an electronic version of traditional mail, e-accounting is "electronic enablement" of lawful accounting and traceable accounting processes which were traditionally manual and paper-based.

E-accounting involves performing regular accounting functions, accounting research, and the accounting training and education through various internet-based or computer-based accounting tools, such as digital tool kits, various internet resources, international web-based materials, institute and company databases which are internet based, web links, internet based accounting software and electronic financial spreadsheet tools to provide efficient decision making.

Online accounting through a web application is typically based on a simple monthly charge and zero-administration approach to help businesses concentrate on core activities and avoid the hidden costs associated with traditional accounting software such as installation, upgrades, exchanging data files, backup, and disaster recovery.

E-accounting does not have a standard definition, but merely refers to the changes in accounting due to computing and networking technologies. Most e-accounting services are offered as SaaS (Software-as-a-service).

== Uses ==
- E-Invoicing
- Accounts payable
- Accounts receivable
- Payroll
