= Negative assurance =

Accounting assurance technique

Negative assurance within accounting ethics (also known as limited assurance), is a method used by the Certified Public Accountant to assure various parties, such as bankers and stockbrokers, that financial data under review by them is reasonable. Negative assurance tells the data user that nothing has come to the CPA's attention of an adverse nature or character regarding the financial data reviewed.

== Accounting ==
This type of assurance is normally given to investment bankers and the SEC when the financial data are being used for stock and bond issuance. In addition, this assurance is given whenever a CPA is asked to comment on financial statements upon which a previous Audit Opinion has been rendered. (This type of assurance is unacceptable for the basic financial statements on which a certifying audit has been performed.) Negative assurance is also issued for in review engagements, which are a similar but lower level of service when compared to an audit.

Negative assurance comments are made on unaudited financial statements and subsequent changes, indicating that nothing came to the auditor's attention that suggests the statements do not comply with applicable accounting requirements; are not fairly presented in conformity with GAAP applied on a consistent basis; or do not fairly present information shown therein. Negative assurance is given because the auditor has not made an examination in conformity with Generally Accepted Auditing Standards (GAAS). Negative assurance is not appropriate unless the CPA has made an examination in accordance with GAAS for the accounting period before the current one. This is because the auditor needs evidence that can be related to comfort letter procedures. For negative assurance to be permissible, the evidence must have been gathered directly by the CPA giving the assurance, and not by another CPA.

== Law practice ==
Negative assurance is also used in modern day law practice, as the assurance can be used when a defense of "due diligence" needs to be established. Negative assurance is provided in letter format, and is used explicitly in conjunction with another document. The letter is usually used by the counsel to establish two standard facts about the document in question. Specifically, that the counsel has read the document in question, and that the counsel is not answerable for the document's accuracy, completeness, or fairness. While negative assurance is not considered a legal opinion, third parties and underwriters often use Negative assurance to circumvent accountability charges.

== See also ==
- Index of accounting articles
- Positive assurance
