= Comptroller General of the United States =

Director of the Government Accountability Office

Comptroller General of the United States of America
- Seal of the United States Government Accountability Office

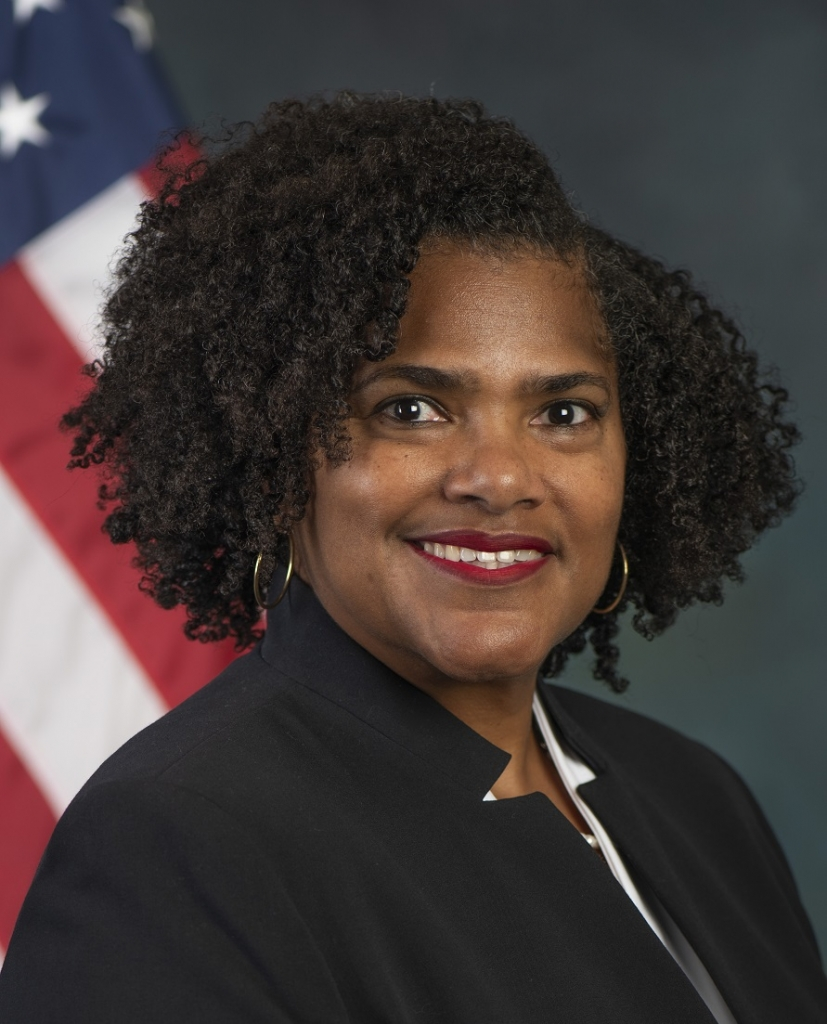
- Incumbent; Orice Williams Brown; Acting since December 30, 2025
- Government Accountability Office
- Type: Director; Comptroller
- Appointer: President of the United States; with the advice and consent of the Senate
- Term length: 15 years
- Constituting instrument: Budget and Accounting Act of 1921
- Formation: 1921
- First holder: John R. McCarl
- Website: Official website

The comptroller general of the United States is the director of the Government Accountability Office (GAO, formerly known as the General Accounting Office), a legislative-branch agency established by Congress in 1921 to ensure the fiscal and managerial accountability of the federal government.

== Overview ==
The Budget and Accounting Act of 1921 "created an establishment of the Government to be known as the General Accounting Office, which shall be independent of the executive departments and under the control and direction of the Comptroller General of the United States". The act also provided that the "Comptroller General shall investigate, at the seat of government or elsewhere, all matters relating to the receipt, disbursement, and application of public funds, and shall make to the President when requested by him, and to Congress... recommendations looking to greater economy or efficiency in public expenditures." The comptroller general is appointed for fifteen years by the president of the United States with the advice and consent of the Senate per 31 U.S.C. § 703. Also per 31 U.S.C. § 703 when the office of comptroller general is to become vacant the current comptroller general must appoint an executive or employee of the GAO to serve as the acting comptroller general until such time as a new comptroller general is appointed by the president and confirmed by the Senate.

The comptroller general has the responsibility to audit the financial statements that the treasury secretary and the Office of Management and Budget director present to the Congress and the president. For every fiscal year since 1996, when consolidated financial statements began, the comptroller general has refused to endorse the accuracy of the consolidated figures for the federal budget, citing "(1) serious financial management problems at the Department of Defense, (2) the federal government’s inability to adequately account for and reconcile intragovernmental activity and balances between federal agencies, and (3) the federal government’s ineffective process for preparing the consolidated financial statements."

Upon the conclusion of his term on December 30, 2025, Gene Dodaro retired as Comptroller General. Orice Williams Brown is leading the GAO in the interim. Dodaro assumed office on December 22, 2010. He was preceded by David M. Walker. On February 15, 2008, Walker announced that he was resigning from GAO to head The Peter G. Peterson Foundation. Dodaro became Acting Comptroller General of the United States on March 13, 2008, and was subsequently appointed by the president on September 22, 2010, and confirmed by the Senate on December 22, 2010, as the comptroller general. Dodaro was sworn in at a ceremony at the GAO on December 30, 2010.

== List of officeholders ==
No.	Portrait	Name (born–died)	Term of office			Appointing president	Ref.
No.	Portrait	Name (born–died)	Took office	Left office	Time in office	Appointing president	Ref.
1		John R. McCarl (1879–1940)	July 1, 1921	June 30, 1936	14 years, 365 days	Warren G. Harding	
2		Fred H. Brown (1879–1955)	April 11, 1939	June 19, 1940	1 year, 69 days	Franklin D. Roosevelt	
3		Lindsay Carter Warren (1889–1976)	November 1, 1940	April 30, 1954	13 years, 180 days	Franklin D. Roosevelt	
4		Joseph Campbell (1900–1984)	December 14, 1954	July 31, 1965	10 years, 229 days	Dwight D. Eisenhower	
5		Elmer B. Staats (1914–2011)	March 8, 1966	March 3, 1981	14 years, 360 days	Lyndon B. Johnson	
6		Charles Bowsher (1931–2022)	October 6, 1981	September 30, 1996	14 years, 360 days	Ronald Reagan	
7		David M. Walker (born 1951)	November 9, 1998	March 12, 2008	9 years, 124 days	Bill Clinton	
8		Gene Dodaro (born 1951)	December 30, 2010	December 30, 2025	15 years, 0 days	Barack Obama	
acting		Orice Williams Brown	December 30, 2025	Incumbent	291 days	N/A	

== See also ==
- INTOSAI
- Supreme audit institution
