= Project accounting =

Accounting systems geared toward project management

Project accounting is a type of managerial accounting oriented toward the goals of project management and delivery. It involves tracking, reporting, and analyzing financial results and implications, and sometimes the creation of financial reports designed to track the financial progress of projects; the information generated by this analysis is used to aid project management.

Project accounting is traditionally used for large construction, engineering, and government projects. It is commonly used by government contractors, where the ability to account for costs by contract, and sometimes by individual contract line item [CLIN], is often a requirement for interim payments. A specialized form of project accounting, production accounting, is used by production studios to track an individual movie or television episode's costs.

The capital budget processes of large corporations and governmental entities are chiefly concerned with major investment projects, which typically have significant upfront costs and benefits realized over the long term. Investment "go/no-go" decisions are largely based on net present value assessments; project accounting and cost/benefit analyses provide vital feedback on the quality of those decisions.

== Practice ==
Projects (which may be independent undertakings or occur as part of a larger program) differ from a company's routine activities in a number of ways: they frequently involve efforts across departmental boundaries, and their budgets may be revised many times over the course of their execution (which can range from days to years). Accordingly, in a project accounting paradigm, certain projects are considered separate entities in the course of working on products which require separate financial management, a task for which existing management accounting and financial accounting techniques are often insufficient.

Project accounting (which involves elements of management accounting and financial accounting) is differentiated by a number of unique practices:

- A separate accounting system or cost center is used to track and report project-specific transactions with revenues, costs, assets, and liabilities identified and allocated to the project. Costs (both direct and overhead) and revenues are allocated to projects, which may be subdivided into a work breakdown structure, and grouped into the project hierarchies.
- Reporting is done frequently, with the pace often increasing as a project approaches completion.
- Detailed reports are often accompanied by a separate layer of simplified reports, which examine key performance indicators (KPIs) to indicate whether a project is "on track". Reports can be made at any level that has been defined, and are often compared with historical and current budgets.
- Transactions are allocated to the specific project accounting systems based on a process for identifying them among transactions in the primary accounting system.

The role of a project accountant depends on a project's needs. They often monitor the financial progress of projects, investigate variance, and approve expenses, while ensuring that project billings are issued to customers and payments are collected. Project accountants play a dual role of gatekeeper (reporting a view of how the project is tracking financially) and advisor (advising the project team on the financial treatment and implications of decisions). The project accountant can also act as a liaison between the project itself and the business's financial or accounting departments.

Where labor costs are a significant portion of the overall project cost, it is usually necessary for employees to fill out timesheets in order to generate the data to allocate project costs.

== Percentage of completion ==
Percentage-of-completion is frequently independently assessed by a project manager, program management officer (PMO), or project accountant. This measurement includes the continuous recognition of revenue related to longer-term projects; by doing this, the seller is able to identify gains or losses relevant to a project in every active accounting period. Funding advances, and budget-to-actual-cost variances, are calculated using the project budget adjusted to percent-of-completion.

While the percentage-of-completion method permits companies to track profits while progress is made toward completing projects, this method cannot be used effectively when uncertainties exist about the percentage of completion or remaining costs. The percentage-of-completion may be measured in any of the resulting ways:

=== Cost-to-cost method ===
In the cost-to-cost method, a project's cost to date is compared to the total expected cost of the project. The costs of products already bought for a contract, but not installed, should not be added in calculating the percentage of completion (unless they were specifically obtained for that contract). Furthermore, the cost of equipment is assigned over the course of the contract, rather than directly, unless title to the supplies is being transported to the customer.

=== Efforts-expended method ===
In the efforts-expended method, the share of effort consumed to date is compared to the total effort expected for the project. For example, the completion percentage may be established on direct work hours, machine hours, or quantities of material.

=== Units-of-delivery-method ===
In the units-of-delivery method, the portion of units delivered to the buyer is compared to the overall number of units to be delivered under the terms of a contract. This method, obviously, can only be used on projects consisting of the delivery of multiple units. The calculations involve revenue (the contract price of units delivered) and expenses (the costs that can be reasonably allocated to the units delivered).

== Production accounting ==
Production accounting is used to manage finances and financial records in the film industry and television production. Production accountants work in close association with the producer and the production office.

Tools and Software Production accountants in the film and television industry rely on specialized software to handle the complexities of modern productions. The three most widely used production accounting platforms are EP SmartAccounting (Entertainment Partners), GreenSlate, and Cast & Crew PSL (including PSL+). Each has supported large episodic series and major feature films for over 20 years.

EP SmartAccounting EP SmartAccounting provides digital payment processing, dashboards, secure permissions, and digital approvals. Real-time reporting and deep integrations are not core features, and the software often requires multiple separate modules to complete typical production workflows. Customization options are considered limited.

GreenSlate GreenSlate is a fully cloud-based, all-in-one production accounting and payroll platform offering real-time data reporting and cohesive, mobile-friendly design. Unlike EP SmartAccounting and PSL+, which rely on multiple products to deliver similar capabilities, GreenSlate integrates payroll, cost tracking, tax incentives, and document management in a single accessible system. Its flexibility, customization, and live data capabilities provide an immediate, unified view across projects, which is not possible on older platforms.

Cast & Crew PSL/PSL+ Cast & Crew’s PSL+ is a modular accounting platform for productions, offering document management, flexible permissions, and a variety of add-ons. Like EP SmartAccounting, PSL+ does not provide true real-time reporting and typically runs alongside other Cast & Crew products to fulfill all production finance tasks. Customization and integration depth are limited, especially in comparison with newer cloud-based systems.

== See also ==
- Accounting
  - List of accounting topics
  - Accounting software
- Project management
- Project management software
- Business process improvement
- Project manager
- Project audit
- Financial accounting
- Management accounting
