= United States Government Accountability Office =

US federal government agency

- Seal of the U.S. Government Accountability Office

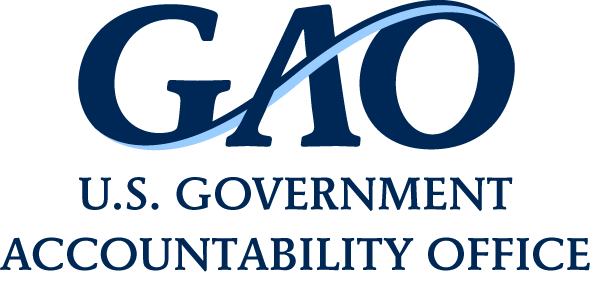
- Logo of the U.S. Government Accountability Office

- Flag

Agency overview
- Formed: July 1, 1921; 105 years ago
- Headquarters: 441 G St., NW Washington, D.C., U.S. 20548
- Employees: 3,015 FTEs (2018)
- Annual budget: $916 million (FY2025)
- Agency executive: Orice Williams Brown, Comptroller General of the United States
- Website: gao.gov

Footnotes
- Measurable benefits of GAO work total $214.7 billion, a return of $338 for every dollar invested.

The United States Government Accountability Office (GAO) is a federal agency within the legislative branch of the United States government that provides auditing, evaluative, and investigative services for the United States Congress in an independent and nonpartisan capacity. It is headquartered in Washington, D.C., at the US General Accounting Office Building in Judiciary Square, and has a headquarters office annex at the Longworth House Office Building on Capitol Hill.

The GAO is the supreme audit institution of the federal government of the United States. It identifies its core "mission values" as: accountability, integrity, and reliability. It is also known as the "congressional watchdog".

The agency is headed by the comptroller general of the United States. The current acting comptroller general is Orice Williams Brown, who has served in the position since December 30, 2025.

== Powers of GAO ==
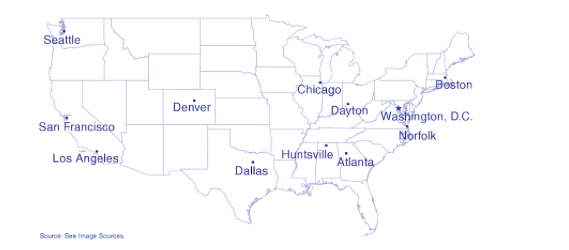
GAO local offices, 2009

The work of the GAO is done at the request of congressional committees or subcommittees or is mandated by public laws or committee reports. It also undertakes research under the authority of the Comptroller General. It supports congressional oversight by:

- auditing agency operations to determine whether federal funds are being spent efficiently and effectively;
- investigating allegations of illegal and improper activities;
- reporting on how well government programs and policies are meeting their objectives;
- performing policy analyses and outlining options for congressional consideration;
- issuing legal decisions and opinions;
- advising Congress and the heads of executive agencies about ways to make government more efficient and effective.

As a result of its work, GAO produces:

- reports and written correspondence;
- testimonies and statements for the record, where the former are delivered orally by one or more GAO senior executives at a congressional hearing, and the latter are provided for inclusion in the Congressional Record;
- briefings, which are usually given directly to congressional staff members;
- legal decisions and opinions resolving bid protests and addressing issues of appropriations law, as well as opinions on the scope and exercise of authority of federal officers;
- science and technology assessments.

The GAO also produces special publications on specific issues of general interest to many Americans, such as its report on the fiscal future of the United States, GAO's role in the federal bid protest process, and critical issues for congressional consideration related to improving the nation's image abroad.

== Organization ==
=== Appointment of the Comptroller General ===
The comptroller general of the United States, the agency executive of the Government Accountability Office, is appointed by the president with the advice and consent of the Senate. When a vacancy occurs in the office of the comptroller general, Congress establishes a commission to recommend individuals to the president. The commission consists of the following:

- the speaker of the United States House of Representatives
- the president pro tempore of the United States Senate
- the majority and minority leaders of the House of Representatives and the Senate
- the chair and ranking member of the Senate Committee on Homeland Security and Governmental Affairs
- the chair and ranking member of the House Committee on Oversight

The commission must recommend at least three individuals to the president, and the president may request that the commission recommend additional individuals. The president then selects an individual from those recommended to nominate as the new Comptroller General. The president's nomination must be confirmed by the Senate Committee on Homeland Security & Governmental Affairs before being voted on by the full Senate.

=== Agency structure ===
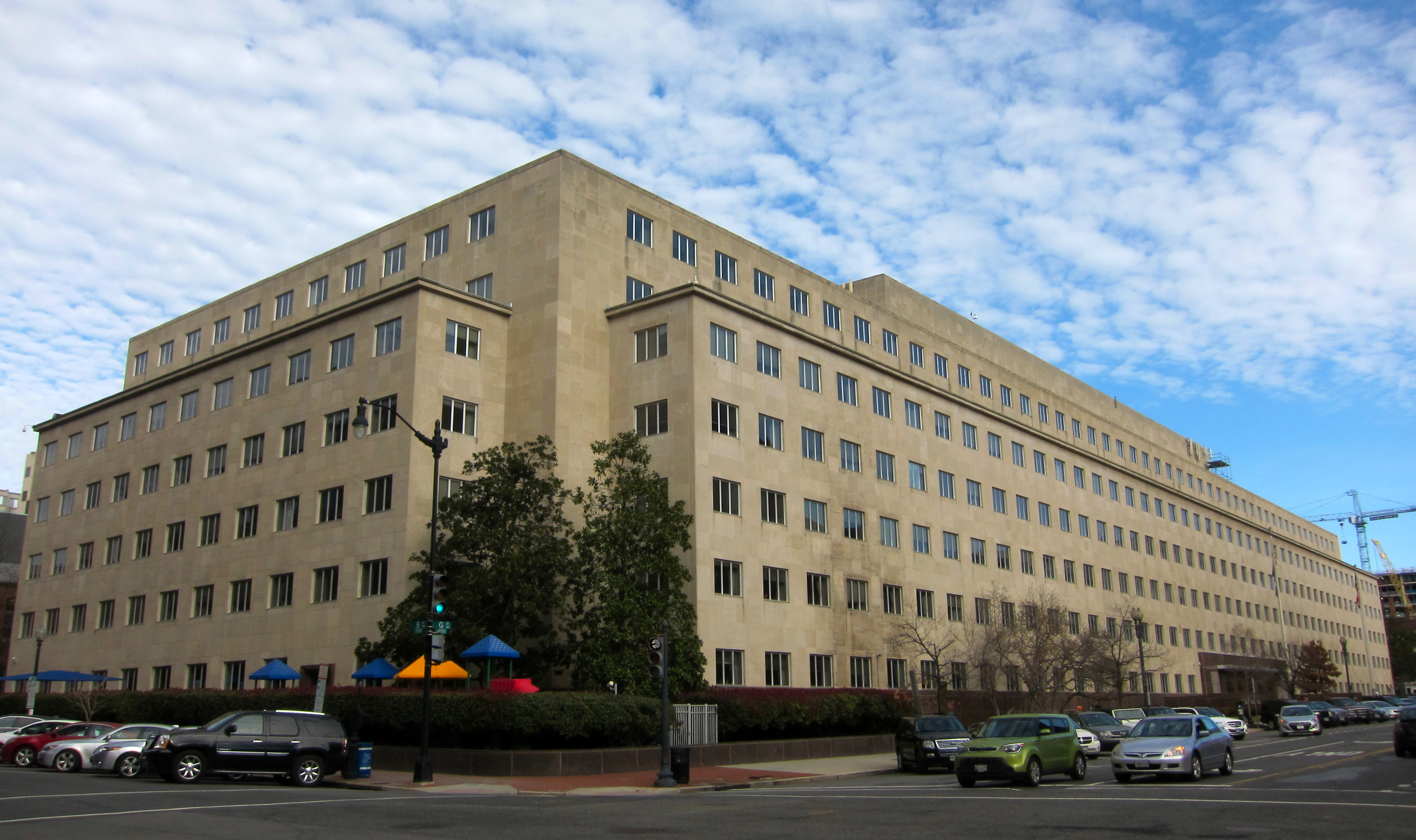
GAO headquarters in Washington, D.C.

The GAO is headquartered in Washington, D.C., and maintains an additional 11 field offices around the country. Each field office contains several mission teams, but not every mission team is represented at each field office.

==== Headquarters ====
Headquartered in Washington, DC, the GAO's main office is located at the US General Accounting Office Building (GAO Building) in Judiciary Square; unlike most other federal government buildings it is directly owned and operated by the agency itself and is managed by EMCOR Government Services (Emcor / EMCOR Group) through a government contract, rather than the General Services Administration in order the prevent a conflict of interest with the executive branch agencies they audit; unlike other legislative branch agencies it is not operated by the Architect of the Capitol which manages the physical infrastructure for core buildings that are part of the United States Capitol Complex.

In addition, the headquarters office has an annex at the Longworth House Office Building on Capitol Hill that is managed by the Architect of the Capitol as one of the congressional office buildings that make up a core part the United States Capitol Complex.

==== Mission teams ====
The GAO is composed of 15 mission teams that work on reports in a given subject area. Missions teams are headed by a managing director which fall under the Senior Executive Service. The current slate of mission teams is:

- Applied Research and Methods (ARM)
- Contracting and National Security Acquisitions (CNSA)
- Defense Capabilities and Management (DCM)
- Education, Workforce, and Income Security (EWIS)
- Financial Management and Assurance (FMA)
- Financial Markets and Community Investment (FMCI)
- Forensic Audits and Investigative Service (FAIS)
- Health Care (HC)
- Homeland Security and Justice (HSJ)
- Information Technology and Cybersecurity (ITC)
- International Affairs and Trade (IAT)
- Natural Resources and Environment (NRE)
- Physical Infrastructure (PI)
- Science, Technology, Assessments, and Analytics (STAA)
- Strategic Issues (SI)

==== Staff offices ====
In addition to its mission teams, the GAO also has 16 operations and staff components that support their work and carryout other agency functions, including its bid decisions.

- Audit Policy and Quality Assurance (APQA)
- Chief Administrative Office (CAO)
- Congressional Relations (CR)
- Continuous Process Improvement (CPI)
- Financial Management and Business Operations (FMBO)
- Field Operations (FO)
- Human Capital Office (HCO)
- Infrastructure Operations (IO)
- Information Systems & Technology Services (ISTS)
- Learning Center (LC)
- Professional Development Program (PDP)
- Office of the General Counsel (OGC)
- Office of the Inspector General (OIG)
- Office of Opportunity & Inclusiveness (O&I)
- Office of Public Affairs (OPA)
- Strategic Planning and External Liaison (SPEL)

== History ==
The seal of the General Accounting Office from 1921 to 2004, when it was renamed

The GAO was established as the General Accounting Office by the Budget and Accounting Act of 1921. The act required the head of the GAO to:

investigate, at the seat of government or elsewhere, all matters relating to the receipt, disbursement, and application of public funds, and shall make to the President ... and to Congress ... reports [and] recommendations looking to greater economy or efficiency in public expenditures.

According to the GAO's current mission statement, the agency exists to support the Congress in meeting its constitutional responsibilities and to help improve the performance and ensure the accountability of the federal government for the benefit of the American people.

The name was changed in 2004 to the Government Accountability Office by the GAO Human Capital Reform Act to better reflect the mission of the office. The GAO's auditors conduct not only financial audits, but also engage in a wide assortment of performance audits.

Over the years, the GAO has been referred to as "The Congressional Watchdog" and "The Taxpayers' Best Friend" for its frequent audits and investigative reports that have uncovered waste and inefficiency in government. News media often draw attention to the GAO's work by publishing stories on the findings, conclusions, and recommendations of its reports. Members of Congress also frequently cite the GAO's work in statements to the press, congressional hearings, and floor debates on proposed legislation. In 2007 the Partnership for Public Service ranked the GAO second on its list of the best places to work in the federal government and Washingtonian magazine included the GAO on its 2007 list of great places to work in Washington, a list that encompasses the public, private, and non-profit sectors.

The GAO is headed by the comptroller general of the U.S., a professional and non-partisan position in the U.S. government. The comptroller general is appointed by the president, by and with the advice and consent of the Senate, for a fifteen-year, non-renewable term. The president selects a nominee from a list of at least three individuals recommended by an eight-member bipartisan, bicameral commission of congressional leaders. During such a term, the comptroller general has standing to pursue litigation to compel access to federal agency information. The comptroller general may not be removed by the president, but only by Congress through impeachment or joint resolution for specific reasons. Since 1921, there have been only eight comptrollers general, and no formal attempt has ever been made to remove a comptroller general.

Labor-management relations became fractious during the nine-year tenure of the seventh comptroller general, David M. Walker. On September 19, 2007, GAO analysts voted by a margin of two to one (897–445), in a 75% turnout, to establish the first union in the GAO's 86-year history. The analysts voted to affiliate with the International Federation of Professional and Technical Engineers (IFPTE), a member union of the AFL–CIO. There are more than 1,800 analysts in the GAO analysts bargaining unit; the local voted to name itself IFPTE Local 1921, in honor of the date of the GAO's establishment. On February 14, 2008, the GAO analysts' union approved its first-ever negotiated pay contract with management; of just over 1,200 votes, 98% were in favor of the contract.

The GAO also establishes standards for audits of government organizations, programs, activities, and functions, and of government assistance received by contractors, nonprofit organizations, and other nongovernmental organizations. These standards, often referred to as Generally Accepted Government Auditing Standards (GAGAS), are to be followed by auditors and audit organizations when required by law, regulation, agreement, contract, or policy. These standards pertain to auditors' professional qualifications, the quality of audit effort, and the characteristics of professional and meaningful audit reports.

In 1992, the GAO hosted the XIV INCOSAI, the fourteenth triennial convention of the International Organization of Supreme Audit Institutions (INTOSAI).

== Quinquennial strategic plan ==
The most recent GAO strategic plan, for 2018–2023, sets out four goals, namely:

1. Address current and emerging challenges to the well-being and financial security of the American people;
2. Help the Congress respond to changing security threats and the challenges of global interdependence;
3. Help transform the Federal Government to address national challenges;
4. Maximize the value of the GAO by enabling quality, timely service to the Congress and by being a leading practices federal agency.

== Reports ==
The GAO is a United States government electronic data provider, as all of its reports are available on its website, except for certain reports whose distribution is limited to official use in order to protect national security. The variety of their reports' topics range from Federal Budget and Fiscal Issues to Financial Management, Education, Retirement Issues, Defense, Homeland Security, Administration of Justice, Health Care, Information Management and Technology, Natural Resources, Environment, International Affairs, Trade, Financial Markets, Housing, Government Management and Human Capital, and Science and Technology Assessments and Analytics. The GAO often produces highlights of its reports that serve as a statement for the record for various subcommittees of the United States Congress.

Most GAO studies and reports are initiated by requests from members of Congress, including requests mandated in statute, and so reflect concerns of current political import, for example to study the impact of a government-wide hiring freeze. Many reports are issued periodically and take a long view of US agencies' operations. The GAO also produces annual reports on key issues including duplication and cost savings and High-Risk Update.

The GAO prepares some 900 reports annually. Reports and information relate, inter alia, to:

Financial statements of the US government

Each year the GAO issues an audit report on the financial statements of the United States Government. The 2010 Financial Report of the United States Government was released on December 21, 2010. The accompanying press release states that the GAO 'cannot render an opinion on the 2010 consolidated financial statements of the federal government, because of widespread material internal control weaknesses, significant uncertainties, and other limitations'.

US public debt

As part of its initiative to advocate sustainability, the GAO publishes a Federal Fiscal Outlook Report, as well as data relating to the deficit. The U.S. deficit is presented on a cash rather than accruals basis, although the GAO notes that the accrual deficit "provides more information on the longer-term implications of the government's annual operations". In FY 2010, the US federal government had a net operating cost of $2,080 billion, although since this includes accounting provisions (estimates of future liabilities), the cash deficit is $1,294 billion.

Defense

The GAO reports frequently on how the Department of Defense organises its spending programs and secures value for money.

Forensic Audits and Investigative Service reports

The Forensic Audits and Investigative Service (FAIS) team provides Congress with high-quality forensic audits and investigations of fraud, waste, and abuse; other special investigations; and security and vulnerability assessments. Its work cuts across a diverse array of government programs administered by the IRS, the Centers for Medicare and Medicaid Services, the Department of Veterans Affairs, and the Department of Homeland Security, among others. In April 2024, the GAO published a report entitled "Fraud Risk Management", which concluded that between the years 2018 to 2024, the U.S. federal government lost an estimated $233 billion to $521 billion annually due to fraud.

== Bid protests ==
Unsuccessful bidders for government contracts may submit protests if they have reason to challenge an agency's decision, and the GAO may then release a report on the decision, redacted if necessary. Various GAO decisions have confirmed that:

In reviewing protests of an agency’s evaluation, [GAO] does not reevaluate proposals, rather, we review the evaluation to determine if it was reasonable, consistent with the solicitation’s evaluation scheme and procurement statutes and regulations, and adequately documented.

There is a facility within the Bid Protest Regulations for the GAO to recommend reimbursement of a bidder's protest costs if the procuring agency takes corrective action in response to a protest. The circumstances justifying bid protest cost reimbursement must involve "undue delay" by the agency in "taking corrective action in the face of a clearly meritorious protest".

The GAO confirmed in 2014 that its jurisdiction includes investigation of protests raising allegations of agency violation of the Procurement Integrity Act.

== Technology assessments ==
After the closing of the Office of Technology Assessment (OTA) in 1995, Congress directed the GAO to conduct a technology assessment (TA) pilot program. Between 2002 and 2005, three reports were completed: use of biometrics for border security, cyber security for critical infrastructure protection, and technologies for protecting structures in wildland fires. The GAO reports and technology assessments, which are made available to the public, have become essential vehicles for understanding science and technology (S&T) implications of policies considered by the Congress.

Since 2008, Congress has established a permanent TA function within the GAO. This new operational role augments GAO's performance audits related to S&T issues, including effectiveness and efficiency of U.S. federal programs. In 2010, the GAO joined the European Parliamentary Technology Assessment (EPTA) as an associate member. In 2019, the GAO established a new mission team, the Science, Technology Assessment, and Analytics team, which has primary responsibility for technology assessments.

The GAO has published a TA Design Handbook to help technology assessment teams analyze the impact of technology and make complex issues more easily understood and useful to policymakers. The GAO defines TA as the "thorough and balanced analysis of significant primary, secondary, indirect, and delayed interactions of a technological innovation with society, the environment, and the economy and the present and foreseen consequences and impacts of those interactions". Recognizing that the effects of those interactions can have implications, the GAO has in some of its products included policy options. The Technology Assessment section of its website lists GAO's public TA reports.

== See also ==
- Title 4 of the Code of Federal Regulations

Offices

- Comptroller and Auditor General
- Comptroller
- Corporate title
- Inspector general
- Comptroller General of the United States
- Director of audit
- Treasurer

Non-governmental organizations (NGOs)

- Government Accountability Project
- Project On Government Oversight

Audit

- Auditor independence
- Negative assurance
- Positive assurance

International

- Australia: Australian National Audit Office
- Botswana: Office of the Auditor General (Botswana)
- Brazil: Court of Accounts of the Union
- Canada: Auditor General of Canada
- Denmark: Rigsrevisionen
- European Union: Court of Auditors
- Hong Kong: Director of Audit of Hong Kong
- India: Comptroller and Auditor General of India
- Mexico: Auditoría Superior de la Federación
- Philippines: Commission on Audit
- Republic of China (Taiwan): Control Yuan
- United Kingdom: National Audit Office
