= Budget and Accounting Act =

- Enacted by: the 67th United States Congress

Legislative history
- Signed into law by President Warren G. Harding on June 10, 1921

The Budget and Accounting Act of 1921 (Pub. L. 67–13, 42 Stat. 20, enacted June 10, 1921) was landmark legislation that established the framework for the modern federal budget. The act was approved by President Warren G. Harding to provide a national budget system and an independent audit of government accounts. The official title of this act is "The General Accounting Act of 1921", but is frequently referred to as "the budget act", or "the Budget and Accounting Act".

This act meant that for the first time, the president would be required to submit an annual budget for the entire federal government to Congress. The object of the budget bill was to consolidate the spending agencies in both the executive and legislative branches of the government.

The act created the Bureau of the Budget, now called the Office of Management and Budget (OMB), to review funding requests from government departments and to assist the president in formulating the budget. The OMB mandates that all government estimates, receipts, and expenditures be cleared by the director of the budget. From the director, the estimates go directly to the president and from the president, directly to Congress. In addition, the act created the General Accounting Office, now known as the Government Accountability Office (GAO), the non-partisan audit, evaluation, and investigative arm of Congress, and an agency in the legislative branch of the United States Government.

The act required the head of the GAO, to "investigate, at the seat of government or elsewhere, all matters in relation to the receipt, disbursement, and application of public funds, and shall make to the President ... and to Congress ... reports [and] recommendations looking to greater economy or efficiency in public expenditures". The name of the General Accounting Office was changed to Government Accountability Office in 2004 to better reflect the mission of the office.

== Bureau of the Budget ==
This act created the Bureau of the Budget, which was a part of the Treasury Department but remained accountable to the White House. In 1939, the Bureau was transferred from the Treasury Department to the Executive Office of the President. The Bureau had authority under the act "to assemble, correlate, revise, reduce, or increase the estimate of the several departments and establishments."

When the Bureau was transferred to the Executive Office, as the OMB, its functions were outlined as:

1.) Assist the president in the preparation of the budget and the formulation of the fiscal program of the government

2.) Supervise and control the administration of the budget

3.) Conduct research in the development of improved plans of administrative management, and to advise the executive departments and agencies of the government with respect to improved administrative organization and practice

4.) Aid the president to bring about more efficient and economical conduct of government service

5.) Assist the president by clearing and coordinating departmental advice on proposed legislative enactment in accordance with past practice

6.) Assist in the consideration and clearance and, where necessary, in the preparation of proposed Executive Orders and proclamations, in accordance with the provisions of Executive Order 7298 of February 18, 1936

7.) Plan and promote the improvement, development, and coordination of federal and other statistics services

8.) Keep the president informed of the progress activities by agencies of the government with respect to work proposed, work actually initiated, and work completed, together with the relative timing and work between the several agencies of the government; all to the end that the work programs of several agencies of the executive branch of the government may be coordinated and that the moneys appropriated by the congress may be expended in the most economical manner possible with the least possible overlapping and duplication effort.

— Congressional Digest 1957

Since the act was originally created, in 1921, additional functions have been added to the activities of the Bureau, which was under the general supervision of a director.

The OMB's staff today "totals between 400 and 500 employees, including an investigating staff of experts, all college graduates, several Rhodes scholars and at least 100 with Master's and Ph.D. degrees. About a third have had practical business experience, four-fifths with experience in government, and some are scientists."

== The General Accounting Office ==
This act also created the GAO as an agency independent of the executive branch and under control of the Comptroller General of the United States, who is appointed by the president for a term of 15 years. The GAO is an independent agency within the legislative branch of the federal government. It was created to perform an independent audit of the government's financial transactions "to determine the efficiency with which financial affairs of federal agencies are managed and to submit to the Congress in specific and annual reports its findings as to financial condition of the government."

Currently the GAO still serves as the lead auditor of the U.S. government's consolidated financial statements. However, this is only a small percentage of the GAO's current workload. Most of the agency's work involves program evaluations, policy analysis, and legal opinions and decisions on a broad range of government programs and activities, both at home and abroad. The GAO also reports on federal programs and policies that are working well and acknowledges progress and improvements. GAO officials regularly consult with lawmakers and agency heads on ways to make the government work better, from adopting best practices to consolidating or eliminating redundant federal programs.

== Significance ==
This act is credited by political science scholars as playing a key role in creating the institutional presidency. As James Sundquist puts it, "The modern presidency, judged in terms of institutional responsibilities, began on June 10, 1921, the day that President Harding signed the Budget and Accounting Act."
