= OBERAC =

Acronym for operating balance excluding revaluations and accounting changes

The acronym OBERAC stands for: 'operating balance excluding revaluations and accounting changes'.

The government of New Zealand uses OBERAC as an indicator of current cash flow.

The OBERAC is not an accurate indicator of what the government has to spend, i.e. it is not the cash surplus. Instead, the OBERAC includes capital expenditure, State Owned Enterprise retained profits, capital gains and many other minor issues.
