= Outline of accounting =

The following outline is provided as an overview of and topical guide to accounting:

Accounting – measurement, statement or provision of assurance about financial information primarily used by managers, investors, tax authorities and other decision makers to make resource allocation decisions within companies, organizations, and public agencies. The terms derive from the use of financial accounts.

== Nature of accounting ==
=== What type of thing is accounting? ===
Accounting can be described as all of the following:

- Vocation – occupation to which a person is specially drawn or for which they are suited, trained, or qualified. Though now often used in non-religious contexts, the meanings of the term originated in Christianity.
  - Profession –
- Academic discipline –

=== Essence of accounting ===
- Bookkeeping
  - Single-entry bookkeeping system
  - Double-entry bookkeeping system
- Financial statements
- Financial audit

== Fields of accounting ==
- Auditing
- Cost accounting – helps managers understand the costs of running a business.
- Financial accounting – field of accountancy concerned with the preparation of financial statements for decision makers, such as stockholders, suppliers, banks, employees, government agencies, owners, and other *stakeholders.
- Forensic accounting – specialty practice area of accountancy that describes engagements that result from actual or anticipated disputes or litigation.
- Fund accounting – accounting system emphasizing accountability rather than profitability, used by non-profit organizations and governments.
- Governmental accounting
- Management accounting – concerned with the provisions and use of accounting information to managers within organizations, to provide them with the basis to make informed business decisions that will allow them to be better equipped in their management and control functions.
- Tax accounting
  - Tax accounting in the United States

== History of accounting ==
History of accounting – dates back to ancient Mesopotamia, and is closely related to developments in writing, counting and money, and early auditing systems by the ancient Egyptians and Babylonians.

- History of technologies leading to the development of accounting
  - History of mathematics
  - History of writing
  - History of money
- History of double-entry bookkeeping systems

== Key concepts ==
- Accounting period – period with reference to which accounting books of any entity are prepared.
- Accrual – in finance, the adding together of interest or different investments over a period of time.
- Bookkeeping – Bookkeeping is the recording of financial transactions.
- Cash and accrual basis – The two primary accounting methods of the cash basis and the accruals basis (the difference being primarily one of timing) are used in three environments: in economics, to calculate US public debt, in financial reporting, as well in tax environment, in order to calculate taxable income for U.S. federal income taxes and other income taxes.
- Cash flow forecasting – key aspect of financial management of a business, planning its future cash requirements to avoid a crisis of liquidity.
- Chart of accounts – list of the accounts used by a business entity to define each class of items for which money or the equivalent is spent or received.
- Constant item purchasing power accounting – consistent method of indexing accounts by means of a general index which reflects changes in the purchasing power of money. It therefore attempts to deal with the inflation problem in the sense in which this is popularly understood, as a decline in the value of the currency. It attempts to deal with this problem by converting all of the currency unit measurement in accounts into units at a common date by means of the index."
- Convergence – goal of establishing a single set of accounting standards that will be used internationally, and in particular the effort to reduce the differences between the US Generally Accepted Accounting Principles, and the International Financial Reporting Standards.
- Cost of goods sold – inventory costs of those goods a business has sold during a particular period.
- Debits and credits – two aspects of every financial transaction.
- Double-entry system – set of rules for recording financial information in a financial accounting system in which every transaction or event changes at least two different nominal ledger accounts.
- FIFO and LIFO – accounting techniques used in managing inventory and financial matters involving the amount of money a company has tied up within inventory of produced goods, raw materials, parts, components, or feed stocks.
- GAAP / IFRS – Generally Accepted Accounting Principles: standard framework of guidelines for financial accounting used in any given jurisdiction; generally known as accounting standards.
- Goodwill – accounting concept meaning the value of an entity over and above the value of its assets.
- Historical cost – original monetary value of an economic item.
- Mark-to-market accounting – accounting for the fair value of an asset or liability based on the current market price of the asset or liability, or for similar assets and liabilities, or based on another objectively assessed "fair" value.
- Matching principle – culmination of accrual accounting and the revenue recognition principle.
- Accounting records
  - Ledgers
    - General ledger – main accounting record of a business which uses double-entry bookkeeping.
  - Journal – where double entry bookkeeping entries are recorded by debiting one or more accounts and crediting another one or more accounts with the same total amount.
    - Special journals – facilitate the process of journalizing and posting transactions.
  - Bank statements
  - Contracts and agreements
  - Verification statements
  - Transportation receipts
  - Invoices
  - Vouchers
- Revenue recognition – cornerstone of accrual accounting together with matching principle.
- Trial balance – list of all the General ledger accounts contained in the ledger of a business.

== Financial statements ==
- Balance sheet – summary of the financial balances of a sole proprietorship, a business partnership, a corporation or other business organization, such as an LLC or an LLP. Assets, liabilities and ownership equity are listed as of a specific date, such as the end of its financial year.
- Cash flow statement – financial statement that shows how changes in balance sheet accounts and income affect cash and cash equivalents, and breaks the analysis down to operating, investing, and financing activities.
- Income statement – financial statement that indicates how the revenue (money received from the sale of products and services before expenses are taken out, also known as the "top line") is transformed into the net income (the result after all revenues and expenses have been accounted for, also known as Net Profit or the "bottom line").
- Statement of changes in equity – financial statement that shows how the equity section of the statements have changed over the year.
- Notes – Notes to financial statements are additional information added to the end of financial statements.
- Management discussion and analysis – integrated part of a company's annual financial statements, and provides a narrative explanation, through the eyes of management, of how an entity has performed in the past, its financial condition, and its future prospects.
- XBRL – eXtensible Business Reporting Language: freely available, open, and global standard for exchanging business information.

== Auditing ==
- Auditor's report – The auditor's report is a formal opinion, or disclaimer thereof, issued by either an internal auditor or an independent external auditor as a result of an internal or external audit or evaluation performed on a legal entity or subdivision thereof.
- Control self-assessment – Control self-assessment is a technique developed in 1987 that is used by a wide range of organisations including corporations, charities and government departments, to assess the effectiveness of their risk management and control processes. In certain circumstances control self-assessment is not always effective. For example, it can be difficult to implement in a decentralised environment, in organisations where there is high employee turnover, where the organisation goes through frequent change or where the senior management of the organisation does not foster a culture of open communication.
- Financial audit – A financial audit, or more accurately, an audit of financial statements, is the verification of the financial statements of a legal entity, with a view to express an audit opinion.
- GAAS / ISA – Generally Accepted Auditing Standards, or GAAS are sets of standards against which the quality of audits are performed and may be judged.
- Internal audit – Internal auditing is an independent, objective assurance and consulting activity designed to add value and improve an organization's operations.
- Sarbanes–Oxley Act – The Sarbanes–Oxley Act of 2002, also known as the 'Public Company Accounting Reform and Investor Protection Act' and 'Corporate and Auditing Accountability and Responsibility Act' and more commonly called Sarbanes–Oxley, Sarbox or SOX, is a United States federal law that set new or enhanced standards for all U.S.

== Accounting software ==
Accounting software

- Accounting information system
- Comparison of accounting software
- E-accounting
- Electronic billing
- Mortgage calculator
- Time-tracking software

== Accounting qualifications ==
- CIA – primary professional designation offered by The IIA.
- CA – first accountants to form a professional body, initially established in Britain in 1854.
- CPA – statutory title of qualified accountants in the United States who have passed the Uniform Certified Public Accountant Examination and have met additional state education and experience requirements for certification as a CPA.
- CCA – historically seen as a British qualified accountant designation awarded by the Association of Chartered Certified Accountants.
- CGA – designation of professionals who are jointly members of the Certified General Accountants Association of Canada and a provincial or territorial CGA association, or a CGA association overseas.
- CMA – used by various professional bodies around the world to designate their different professional certifications.
- CAT – offered by the Association of Chartered Certified Accountants.
- CIIA – global finance designation offered by the Association of Certified International Investment Analysts to financial professionals; candidates may be financial analysts, portfolio managers or investment advisors.
- IIA – guidance-setting body.
- CTP – certification awarded by the Association for Financial Professionals of Bethesda, Maryland to individuals who meet eligibility criteria and demonstrate current competency standards measured through the CTP examination.

== Accounting organizations ==
- Accounting network
- List of accountancy bodies

== Accounting publications ==
=== Journals ===
- Abacus
- Accounting and the Public Interest
- Accounting Historians Journal
- Accounting History
- Accounting History Review
- Accounting Horizons
- Accounting Perspectives
- Accounting, Auditing & Accountability Journal
- Accounting, Organizations and Society
- Advances in Public Interest Accounting
- British Accounting Review
- Contemporary Accounting Research
- Critical Perspectives on Accounting
- European Accounting Review
- Journal of Accounting and Economics
- Journal of Accounting and Public Policy
- Journal of Accounting Research
- Journal of Accounting, Auditing & Finance
- Journal of Business Finance & Accounting
- Management Accounting Quarterly
- Research in Accounting Regulation
- Review of Accounting Studies
- Social and Environmental Accounting Journal
- The Accounting Review
- The Progressive Accountant

== See also ==
- Outline of business management
  - Accountancy
  - Accounting articles
- Outline of consulting
