= List of accounting journals =

Academic journals are peer-reviewed periodicals that publish research papers. A variety of academic journals publish accounting and auditing research.

Publishing in leading accounting journals affects many aspects of an accounting researcher's career, including reputation, salary, and promotion. Empirical studies suggest that publishing in leading accounting journals tends to be more difficult than in other business disciplines. In some universities, the number of articles a faculty member publishes in top journals is the key measure of his or her research performance. Publishing research in a top journal is generally seen as a significant achievement that demonstrates that the research was recognized by the authors' peers as having significant impact. Additionally, articles in leading accounting journals influence subsequent research, and are often used in training accounting PhD students.

Various methods have been used to determine the leading accounting journals, including surveys of faculty members, and methods based on the number of times the journals' articles were cited. In the 1960s, Eugene Garfield invented the impact factor, a tool for ranking and evaluating journals. A journal's impact factor for a given year is the average number of citations per article published in the preceding two years. Recent studies on accounting research and on doctoral programs in accounting considered the six leading accounting journals to be Accounting, Organizations and Society, The Accounting Review, Contemporary Accounting Research, the Journal of Accounting and Economics, the Journal of Accounting Research and the Review of Accounting Studies.

== Accounting journals ==
Journal	ISSN	2017 SJR	Publisher	Editor(s)-in-chief
Abacus	0001-3072	0.325	Accounting Foundation, University of Sydney	Stewart Jones, University of Sydney
Accounting and Business Research	0001-4788	0.97	Taylor & Francis	Mark Clatworthy, University of Bristol Juan Manuel Garcia Lara, UC3M Edward Lee, University of Manchester
Accounting, Auditing & Accountability Journal	0951-3574	2.187	Emerald Group Publishing	James Guthrie, Macquarie University; Lee D Parker, RMIT University
Accounting Horizons	0888-7993	0.72	American Accounting Association	Paul A. Griffin, University of California, Davis; Arnold M. Wright, Northeastern University
Accounting, Organizations and Society	0361-3682	1.771	Elsevier	Marcia Annisette, York University; Mark E. Peecher, University of Illinois at Urbana–Champaign; Keith Robson, HEC Paris
The Accounting Review	0001-4826	3.946	American Accounting Association	John Harry Evans III, University of Pittsburgh
Accounting & Finance	0810-5391	0.384	Accounting and Finance Association of Australia and New Zealand	Steven Cahan, University of Auckland
Asia-Pacific Journal of Accounting & Economics	1608-1625	0.149	City University of Hong Kong and National Taiwan University	Yin-Wong Cheung, City University of Hong Kong; Hong Hwang, National Taiwan University; Jeong Bon Kim, City University of Hong Kong; Shu-Hsing Li, National Taiwan University; Suresh Radhakrishnan, University of Texas at Dallas
Auditing: A Journal of Practice & Theory	0278-0380	1.71	American Accounting Association	Robert Knechel, University of Florida
Australian Accounting Review	1035-6908	0.358	CPA Australia	Tyrone M. Carlin, University of Sydney
Australian Tax Forum	0812-695X	(Note: Impact factor for 2012 not available in the Journal Citation Reports.)	The Tax Institute	Cynthia Coleman, University of Sydney
Australian Tax Review	0311-094X	0.358	Thomson Reuters	Chris Evans, University of New South Wales; Michael Walpole, University of New South Wales
British Accounting Review	0890-8389	0.986	Elsevier	Nathan Lael Joseph, Aston University; Alan Lowe, Aston University
Behavioral Research in Accounting	1558-8009	0.457	American Accounting Association	Steven Salterio, Queen's University
Contemporary Accounting Research	0823-9150	2.604	Canadian Academic Accounting Association	Patricia C. O'Brien, University of Waterloo
Critical Perspectives on Accounting	1045-2354	1.773	Elsevier	Jane Andrew, University of Sydney; Christine Cooper, University of Edinburgh; Yves Gendron, Université Laval
European Accounting Review	0963-8180	0.902	European Accounting Association	Laurence van Lent, Tilburg University
International Journal of Accounting	0020-7063	0.498	Elsevier	R. Abdel-Khalik, University of Illinois at Urbana-Champaign
Journal of Accountancy	1945-0729		American Institute of Certified Public Accountants	Kim Nilsen
Journal of Accounting, Auditing & Finance	0148-558X	0.321	SAGE Publications	Bharat Sarath, Rutgers University
Journal of Accounting and Economics	0165-4101	6.875	Elsevier	R.L. Watts, Massachusetts Institute of Technology; J. L. Zimmerman, University of Rochester; R.W. Holthausen, University of Pennsylvania; S.P. Kothari, Massachusetts Institute of Technology; J. Core, Massachusetts Institute of Technology; M. Hanlon, Massachusetts Institute of Technology; W.R. Guay, University of Pennsylvania
Journal of Accounting Literature	0737-4607	0.986	Elsevier	S. Asare, University of Florida; W. R. Knechel, University of Florida
Journal of Accounting and Public Policy	0278-4254	0.91	Elsevier	Lawrence A. Gordon, University of Maryland
Journal of Accounting Research	0021-8456	6.957	Accounting Research Center, University of Chicago Booth School of Business	Philip G. Berger, University of Chicago Luzi Hail, University of Pennsylvania Christian Leuz, University of Chicago Haresh Sapra, University of Chicago Douglas J. Skinner, University of Chicago Rodrigo Verdi, Massachusetts Institute of Technology Regina Wittenberg Moerman, University of Southern California
Journal of the American Taxation Association	0198-9073	1.227	American Taxation Association	John Phillips, University of Connecticut
Journal of Business Finance & Accounting	0306-686X	0.91	John Wiley & Sons	Peter F. Pope, London School of Economics; Andrew Stark, Manchester Business School; Martin Walker, Manchester Business School
Journal of International Financial Management and Accounting	0954-1314	0.466	John Wiley & Sons	Sidney Gray, University of Sydney; Richard Levich, New York University
Journal of Management Accounting Research	1049-2127	0.743	American Accounting Association	Ranjani Krishnan, Michigan State University
Journal of Taxation	0022-4863	0.15	Thomson Reuters	Bob D. Scharin, Daniel T. Schibley
Management Accounting Research	1044-5005	1.426	Elsevier	R. Scapens, University of Manchester and University of Birmingham
National Tax Journal	0028-0283	0.818	National Tax Association	William M. Gentry; George R. Zodrow
Review of Accounting Studies	1380-6653	2.757	Springer Science+Business Media	Patricia Dechow, University of Southern California
Review of Quantitative Finance and Accounting	0924-865X	0.477	Springer Science+Business Media	Cheng-few Lee, Rutgers University
Tax Law Review	0040-0041		New York University School of Law	Deborah H. Schenk, New York University
The Tax Adviser	0039-9957		American Institute of Certified Public Accountants	Alistair M. Nevius
