= Madhav V. Rajan =

Indian-American accounting professor

- Education: University of Madras (BCom); Carnegie Mellon University (MS, PhD)
- Scientific career
- Institutions: University of Pennsylvania; Stanford University; University of Chicago

Madhav V. Rajan is an Indian-American accounting professor, currently serving as dean of the Booth School of Business at the University of Chicago since July 2017.

== Education ==
Rajan graduated with a Bachelor of Commerce degree from the University of Madras in India in 1984. He received a Master of Science in accounting in 1987, a Master of Science in industrial administration in 1989, and a Doctor of Philosophy in accounting in 1990, all from Carnegie Mellon University. In 1990, his doctoral dissertation won the Alexander Henderson Award for Excellence in Economic Theory.

== Career ==
At the Wharton School of the University of Pennsylvania, Rajan served as assistant professor from 1990 to 1996 and as tenured associate professor from 1996 to 2000. In 2000, Rajan received the David W. Hauck Award for Outstanding Teaching.

Rajan joined the Stanford Graduate School of Business in 2001. He later became the Robert K. Jaedicke Professor of Accounting. He also served as its senior associate dean for academic affairs from 2010 to 2016.

On March 8, 2017, Rajan was appointed as the incoming dean of the Booth School of Business at the University of Chicago, effective July 1, 2017.

== Authorship and social engagement ==
Rajan is a coauthor of Cost Accounting: A Managerial Emphasis, whose 15th edition was published by Pearson Prentice Hall in January 2014. He is also coauthor of Managerial Accounting, whose first edition was published by Pearson in January 2013. He has published academic articles in journals like the Review of Accounting Studies, the Journal of Accounting and Economics, Management Science, Journal of Accounting Research.

Rajan has served on the board of directors of Cavium since March 2013. He also serves on the board of iShares and the Investment Advisory Board of CM Capital.

=== Works ===
- Datar, Srikant M.; Rajan, Madhav V. (2013). Managerial Accounting: Making Decisions and Motivating Performance. Upper Saddle River, New Jersey: Pearson Prentice Hall. ISBN 9780137024872.
- Datar, Srikant M.; Horngren, Charles T.; Rajan, Madhav V. (2014). Cost Accounting: A Managerial Emphasis. Upper Saddle River, New Jersey: Pearson Prentice Hall. ISBN 9781292018225. OCLC 898294402.
