= Vivian Carpenter =

American academic and business executive

- Born: Detroit, Michigan
- Education: University of Chicago; University of Michigan
- Scientific career
- Fields: Institutional Theory; Public Sector Accounting
- Workplaces: Florida A & M University; Wayne State University; University of Michigan

Dr. Vivian Carpenter (born c. 1952 in Detroit, Michigan) is an American accounting academic and business executive. She focuses her academic research on institutional theory, public sector accounting, and the political effects of adoption of Generally Accepted Accounting Principles (GAAP) by the public sector.

== Education ==
Carpenter attended the University of Michigan where she acquired her MBA, her B.S.E. in Industrial and Operations Research, and her Ph.D. in Business Administration. She spent a year on postdoctoral studies in Economics and Public Policy at the University of Chicago.

== Career ==
As an academic, Carpenter has held numerous scholastic positions including a position as visiting professor of Industrial and Operations Research at the University of Michigan, an assistant professorship in Accounting at Wayne State University, and a position as Assistant Dean at Florida A&M University where she held an associate professorship in Accounting. As a professional, Carpenter has held positions as Deputy State Treasurer at the Michigan Department of Treasury, President of Atwater Entertainment Associates, L.L.C., and most recently, Chair of the Management and Audit Committee for MotorCity Casino in Detroit. In addition, in 1977, Carpenter articled at Arthur Andersen for her Certified Public Accountant designation.

The Governmental Accounting Standards Board, the Ford Foundation, the Kellogg Foundation, and the National Science Foundation have all supported Carpenter's research. She was appointed to serve on review panels for the National Science Foundation, the Ford Foundation, and the Ohio Board of Regents – Research Initiative Fund. She also held a position as a member of the Fulbright International Business Administration Review Panel from 1992 through 1995.

== Awards ==
Throughout her academic career, Carpenter has received numerous honors and awards. In 1991, Carpenter received three national awards. She was awarded the National Achievement Award – Accounting Educator Award by the National Association of Black Accountants, the Author's Award from the Association of Government Accountants for her outstanding article published in the Government Accountants Journal in 1990, and the Decision Sciences Institute's 1991 Best Interdisciplinary paper award. In 1996, she was awarded a $672,000 equipment grant from Hewlett-Packard for establishing a computer network for faculty and staff in the Business School at Florida A & M University.

Carpenter has had publications in the Journal of Accounting and Public Policy; Government Accountants Journal; Governmental Finance Review; Accounting Horizons; Accounting, Organizations and Society; Issues in Accounting Education; and International Journal of Public Administration. In addition, she has served on the editorial board of Research in Government and Non-profit Accounting.

== Selected publications ==
- Carpenter, V., R. Cheng and E. Feroz (2007). "Toward an Empirical Institutional Governance Theory". Corporate Ownership and Control 4(4).
- Carpenter, V. and E. Feroz (2001). "Institutional theory and accounting rule choice: an analysis of four US state governments' decisions to adopt generally accepted accounting principles". Accounting, Organizations and Society, 26, 565-596.
- Carpenter, V. (1991). "The Influence of Political Competition on the Decisions to Adopt GAAP". Journal of Accounting and Public Policy, 10, 105-134.
