= Lisa Koonce =

American academic

Academic background
- Education: University of Illinois Urbana-Champaign; Southern Illinois University

Academic work
- Discipline: Financial accounting
- Institutions: University of Texas; University of Illinois

Lisa Koonce is the Deloitte and Touche endowed chair in accounting at the McCombs School of Business, University of Texas at Austin. Koonce is particularly notable for her research contributions to decision-making processes in financial accounting and auditing.

== Early life and career ==
Lisa Koonce obtained her Bachelor of Administration (Major in Accountancy) in 1981 from Southern Illinois University. One year later, in 1982, she completed a Masters of Administrative Science (Major in Accountancy) at the University of Illinois Urbana-Champaign. In 1990, she completed her Ph.D. in accounting, with a minor in Psychology, also at the University of Illinois Urbana-Champaign.

Upon completing her master's degree, Koonce worked as a senior in-charge auditor at Touche Ross & Company in Chicago (1982–1984). She obtained her Certified Public Accountant (CPA) designation in 1982 and her Certified Management Accountant (CMA) designation in 1984.

Koonce has spent the majority of her career in educational and research-based settings. Following her association with Touche Ross, she held various academic appointments at the University of Illinois and at the University of Texas at Austin. She became a full professor in 2002, and was awarded the Deloitte and Touche Endowed Chair in Accounting in 2009.

Koonce has been honored on several occasions for her research and teaching contributions. She and her co-authors were awarded the 2005 Best Paper Award from Accounting Horizons, a publication of the American Accounting Association. In 2007, she received the Distinguished Teaching Award from the University of Texas, while in 2009, the McCombs School of Business honored her with its Excellence in Education Award.

== Selected publications ==
- 2008 "Investor Reaction to Derivative Use: Experimental Evidence". (L. Koonce, M. Lipe and M. McNally), Review of Accounting Studies (December), pages 571–597.
- 2008 "Management Earnings Forecasts: A Review and Framework". (E. Hirst, L. Koonce and S. Venkataraman), Accounting Horizons (September), pages 315–338.
- 2007 "How Disaggregation Enhances the Credibility of Management Earnings Forecasts". (E. Hirst, L. Koonce and S. Venkataraman), Journal of Accounting Research (September), pages 811–838.
