= McWatters =

McWatters is a surname. Notable people with the surname include:

- Arnie McWatters, Canadian football player
- Cheryl S. McWatters, Canadian academic
- Donald McWatters (born 1941), Australian field hockey player
- Eugene McWatters (born 1978), American serial killer
- Stephen McWatters (1921–2006), English schoolteacher

== See also ==
- McWatters, Quebec, part of Rouyn-Noranda
