= Haresh Sapra =

American academic

Academic background
- Education: University of Houston; University of Minnesota

Academic work
- Discipline: Accounting, Information economics
- Institutions: University of Chicago

Haresh Sapra is the Charles T. Horngren Professor of Accounting at the University of Chicago Booth School of Business specializing in the real effects of accounting disclosure and measurement rules. He is currently a senior editor of the Journal of Accounting Research.

Sapra is an applied theorist who is best known for his research on the impact of mark-to-market accounting on bank stability and the role of accounting conservatism on debt contracting.

== Education ==
Sapra graduated from the University of Houston with a bachelor's degree in accounting in 1991. In 2000, he received a PhD in Business Administration from the University of Minnesota.

== Career ==
Sapra has been a member of the faculty at the University of Chicago since 2000. He has been a visiting professor at Imperial College London. His current research focuses on the impact on loan loss provisioning models such as the Current Expected Credit Loss Model (CECL) on banking regulation.
