= Tobias Scheytt =

German professor on Management

Tobias Scheytt (born 15 March 1963, in Essen, Germany) is a German Professor of Management Accounting and Control, Head of the Department of Management Accounting and Control (ICU), and Head of the Centre of Postgraduate Education (ZWW) at the Helmut Schmidt University (University of the Federal Armed Forces) in Hamburg. Scheytt's academic work covers control systems; risk and risk management; quality management; business development; and public and expert organizations.

== Biography ==
After completing his secondary education in 1981, Tobias Scheytt began his career with a dual apprenticeship as a data entry specialist and foreign language correspondent in Business English. Soon after, he worked as an IT analyst in software development. He started his studies in Economics in 1985 at the Witten/Herdecke University. He completed his graduate examinations in 1991. During a semester abroad he studied Cultural Management at the University of Music and Performing Arts Vienna. In 1996, he finished his dissertation, entitled “The Methodology of Leadership Theory”, under the supervision of Professor Dr. Dr. h.c. Ekkehard Kappler at the Witten/Herdecke University. At the University of Innsbruck, Tobias Scheytt continued working as a research associate with his academic instructor Ekkehard Kappler. In 2008 he obtained his postdoctoral qualification (Habilitation) at the University of Innsbruck with a work on the foundations of Strategic Management Accounting. In the following year Tobias Scheytt accepted the position of Professor for Management Accounting and Control at the Helmut Schmidt University (University of the Federal Armed Forces) in Hamburg.

For the past several years Tobias Scheytt has also been active in various Executive Education Programs. He has led and organized workshops at the Leadership Academy of the Federal Armed Forces, the University of Oldenburg, the University of Innsbruck/Castle Hofen (Austria), the Liechtenstein Academy, and Danube University Krems.

Tobias Scheytt accepted visiting fellowships at the Massachusetts Institute of Technology (MIT), Society for Organizational Learning in Cambridge (MA) (1999) and at King's College London (UK) (2001 and 2002).

Tobias Scheytt is a member of the Commission for Accounting, Organization, and University Management as well as Management Theory and Business Ethics at the German Association for Business Research (VHB). He is also an active member of the European Accounting Association (EAA) and the European Group for Organisational Studies (EGOS). Since 2017 he has been a member of the Accreditation Council at ACQUIN.

He is married and has one son.

== Research and intellectual interests ==
Scheytt has contributed to the development of narratives as a research method in organizational and management research. His research on reputational risks investigates the impact new risk categories on organizational practices. He has conducted longitudinal case studies to investigate how control is influenced and embedded in cultural contexts. Recent research projects cover topics such as governance through quantification in public sector organizations and resistance to management reforms in universities.

Tobias Scheytt is also known for further research on control systems, risk and risk management, quality management, business development, and public and expert organizations. He has also published a variety of methodology papers, with a focus on interpretative and narrative methods. He is the author of a number of publications in leading international scientific journals (for example, Organization Studies, Journal of Management Studies, Organizational Research Methods, European Accounting Review, Management Accounting Research, Critical Perspectives on Accounting).

== Publications ==
- Governing Arts through Valuation: The Role of the State as Network Actor in the European Capital of Culture 2010. Critical Perspectives on Accounting 37, 2016, 35-50 [Special issue "The Arts, the State and Popular Culture", ed. by I. Jaecle & P. Miller] (mit L. Crepaz & C. Huber).
- The Dispositif of Risk Management: Reconstructing Risk Management after the Financial Crisis. Management Accounting Research 24(2), 2013, 88-99 (mit C. Huber).
- Reputational Risk as a Logic of Organizing in Late Modernity. Organization Studies 30(2-3), 2009, 301-324 (mit M. Power, K. Soin, & K. Sahlin).
- Management Accounting in Financial Services. In: Chapman, C.S., Hopwood, A.G., Shields, M.D. (eds.), Handbook of Management Accounting Research, Vol. 3. Amsterdam et al.: Elsevier, 2009, 1385-1398 (mit K. Soin). ISBN 978-00-805-5450-1
- The Future of Interpretive Accounting Research. Critical Perspectives on Accounting 19(6), 2008, 840-866 (mit T. Ahrens, A. Becker, J. Burns, C. Chapman, M. Granlund, M. Habersam, A. Hansen, R. Khalifa, T. Malmi, A. Mennicken, A. Mikes, F. Panozzo, M. Piber & P. Quattrone).
- Introduction: Organizations and the management of risk. Research Colloquium ‘Organizations and the management of risk’. Journal of Management Studies 43(6), 2006, 1331-1337 (mit K. Soin, K. Sahlin-Andersson, & M. Power).
- Making the case for narrative methods in cross-cultural organizational research. Organizational Research Methods 9(1), 2006, 55-77 (mit K. Soin).
- Management Accounting from a Systems Theoretical Perspective. In: Seidl, D. & Becker, K.H. (Eds.), Niklas Luhmann and Organization Theory. Malmö & Copenhagen: Liber & Copenhagen Business School Press [Advances in Organization Studies], 2005, 386-401, ISBN 978-87-630-0162-5
