= Ray J. Ball =

American academic

- Awards: Accounting Hall of Fame (2009)

Academic background
- Education: University of New South Wales (B.Comm.); University of Chicago (MBA, PhD)

Academic work
- Discipline: Economist
- Sub-discipline: Accounting research
- Institutions: University of Chicago; University of Rochester

Raymond J. (Ray) Ball is a researcher and educator in accounting and financial economics. He is the Sidney Davidson Distinguished Service Professor of Accounting in the University of Chicago’s Booth School of Business. He has published foundational research on the economics of financial reporting and financial markets.

== Early life ==
Ball was born in 1944 on the outskirts of Sydney, Australia. He became the first member of his family with an opportunity to graduate high school, and a corporate sponsorship by Rheem (Australia) afforded the opportunity to attend university. He has pursued an academic career ever since.

== Education ==
Ball studied Accounting at the University of NSW (Australia), graduating with First Class Honors and the University Medal. He obtained an MBA degree in 1968 and Ph.D. in economics in 1972 from the University of Chicago, where his doctoral supervisor was Eugene F. Fama. He is a CPA and Fellow of CPA Australia.

== Major Research ==
Ray Ball pioneered the development of financial economics in the area of accounting. He (with Philip Brown) was first to demonstrate the link between firms’ accounting earnings information and their market values. He also was first to identify the existence of systematic anomalies in efficient market theory. He publishes in both the accounting and financial economics literatures, and is ranked in the top 5% of all economists by RePEc (Research Papers in Economics).

His 1968 Journal of Accounting Research paper (co-authored with Philip Brown) revolutionized our understanding of the economic properties of accounting earnings and how earnings information is related to firms’ market values. The paper founded the modern economics-based financial accounting literature.

Ball and Brown (1968) also reported the first anomalous evidence for the Efficient Markets Hypothesis, an important financial economics theory that had been introduced by Eugene F. Fama in 1965. The anomaly was that the stock market reaction to earnings announcements seemed to continue well beyond the announcement date, contrary to the theory. By the early 1970s Ball realized this phenomenon was systematic. That realization eventually was published in a 1978 publication that used Thomas Kuhn’s concept of an anomaly to describe the phenomenon. The paper was the first documentation that anomalies in efficient market theory are systematic. The anomaly became known in the accounting literature as post earnings announcement drift and in the financial economics literature as the profitability factor in asset pricing models.

Other foundational research includes "The Effect of International Institutional Factors on Properties of Accounting Earnings," co-authored with S.P. Kothari and Ashok Robin and published in Journal of Accounting and Economics in 2000, that has influenced much international accounting research. “Earnings Quality in U.K. Private Firms,” co-authored with Lakshmanan Shivakumar and published in Journal of Accounting and Economics in 2005, was influential in opening the accounting literature to researching firms that are not publicly traded.

== Academic positions ==
Ball’s first full-time academic position was as Assistant Professor of Accounting and Finance at the University of Chicago, from 1969 to 1972. Visa restrictions required him to relinquish the position and return to Australia.

In August 1971, at age 26, he was appointed to the position of Professor of Accounting and Finance at the University of Queensland. This made him the youngest person to hold a full professorship in any faculty of that university, and reportedly was the second youngest ever full-professor appointment in any area in any Australian university. During his four years at Queensland, he transformed the Commerce (business) faculty, creating a research culture, emphasising junior faculty development, and introducing the first accounting research workshop in the country.

In 1976 Ball moved to the University of New South Wales in Sydney, as a Foundation Professor in the newly-established Australian Graduate School of Management (AGSM), the first Australian school to offer a US-style full-time MBA program. At AGSM, working with his colleague Philip Brown, Ball oversaw construction of the first financial research databases outside the US, conducted foundational research on the Australian capital market, and developed the first US-style PhD program in Accounting and Finance in Australia. In 1976 he founded the Australian Journal of Management, currently in its 46th year of publication, in recognition of which the Journal annually awards The Ray Ball Prize for the best paper published during the previous year.

In 1986 Ball returned to the U.S. as Wesray Professor of Business Administration in the Simon School at the University of Rochester. At Rochester, from 1986-2000 he edited the Journal of Accounting and Economics, one of the top journals in the field. In 2000 he moved back to Chicago, where until 2015 he edited the Journal of Accounting Research, also one of the top journals in the field.

== Awards ==
In 1986 Ball and Brown (1968) received academic recognition in the American Accounting Association's first Seminal Contributions to Accounting Literature Award, which stated: "No other paper has been cited as often or has played so important a role in the development of accounting research during the past thirty years.”

In 2019 Ball and Brown (1968) received practitioner recognition in the 2019 Wharton-Jacobs Levy Prize for Quantitative Financial Innovation, “given biennially to recognize excellence in quantitative research that has contributed to a particular innovation in the practice of finance.”

Ball was awarded honorary degrees by the Helsinki School of Economics, the Katholieke Universiteit Leuven, the University of Queensland, the University of London, and the University of New South Wales. He was elected to the U.S. Accounting Hall of Fame in 2009 and to the Australian Accounting Hall of Fame in 2018. In 2015, the Institute of Chartered Accountants in England and Wales made him its eighth Honorary Member. He was a Fulbright Scholar.

== Service ==
Ball serves on the Advisory Group for the Financial Reporting Faculty of the Institute of Chartered Accountants in England and Wales (ICAEW). He has served on the Financial Accounting Standards Advisory Council (FASAC) of the Financial Accounting Standards Board (FASB), on the Shadow Financial Regulation Committee, and as a Trustee of Harbor Funds. He served as a professor at the European Institute for Advanced Studies in Management for many years.

== Family ==
He and his wife, Janice, were married in 1970, and have two children and four grandchildren. Janice holds a doctorate from the University of Rochester, is retired from teaching at DePaul University and has published extensively in poetry.
