= Ray Ball =

Ray Ball may refer to:

- Ray Ball (footballer) (born 1949), Australian rules footballer
- Ray J. Ball, American academic
