= Koonce =

Koonce is a surname. Notable people with the surname include:

- Cal Koonce (1940–1993), American baseball player
- Donnie Ray Koonce (born 1959), American basketball player
- George Koonce (born 1968), American football player
- Graham Koonce (born 1975), American baseball player
- Lisa Koonce, American academic
- Malcolm Koonce (born 1998), American football player
