= Metzler Visiting Professorship =

Exchange program

The Metzler Visiting Professorship in International Finance, founded by the German private bank Bankhaus Metzler in 1992, is an academic exchange program between the Wharton School of the University of Pennsylvania in Philadelphia, Pennsylvania, and the Goethe University Frankfurt, Germany.

== Previous Participants from the Wharton School (in chronological order) ==
- Wayne Guay
- Amir Yaron
- Philipp Illeditsch
- Iwan Barankay
- Nikolai Roussanov
- Ulrich Doraszelski
- Karen Lewis
- Gregory Nini
- Olivia S. Mitchell
- Richard Herring
- Itay Goldstein
- Franklin Allen
- Christian Leuz
- Alexander Muermann
- J. David Cummins
- A. Craig MacKinlay
- Bruce Grundy
- Robert E. Verrecchia
- Gordon M. Bodnar
- Paul R. Kleindorfer
- Neil Doherty
- Oded H. Sarig
- Richard Kihlstrom

== Previous Participants from Goethe-University (in chronological order) ==
- Martin Götz
- Ralph Rogalla
- Christoph Meinerding
- Raimond Maurer
- Uwe Bloos
- Patrick Behr
- Michael Grote
- Marcel Tyrell
- Christian Laux
- Mark Wahrenburg
- Christian Schlag
- Heinrich Rommelfanger
- Ralf Ewert
- Günther Gebhardt
- Jan Pieter Krahnen
- Reinhard H.Schmidt
- Roland Eisen
- Helmut Laux
