= Abacus (journal) =

Academic journal on accounting

- Discipline: Accounting
- Language: English
- Edited by: Stewart Jones and Baljit K. Sidhu

Publication details
- History: 1965–present
- Publisher: Wiley-Blackwell on behalf of the Accounting Foundation (University of Sydney)
- Frequency: Quarterly
- Open access: Hybrid
- Impact factor: 2.5 (2023)

Standard abbreviations
- ISO 4: Abacus

Indexing
- ISSN: 0001-3072 (print); 1467-6281 (web)
- LCCN: 90643859
- OCLC no.: 01460523

Links
- Journal homepage; Online access

Abacus is a peer-reviewed quarterly academic journal published by Wiley-Blackwell on behalf of the Accounting Foundation, University of Sydney. It was established in 1965 by Raymond J. Chambers under the Accounting Foundation, University of Sydney. Abacus focuses on accounting, finance, and business studies, and has its editorial offices at the University of Sydney in Australia. The current editors-in-chief are Stewart Jones and Baljit K. Sidhu, both from the University of Sydney. According to the Journal Citation Reports, the journal has a 2023 impact factor of 2.5.

The Accounting Foundation, funds a US$10,000 Annual Manuscript Award for the best article published in Abacus in each calendar year.

== History ==
In 1953, Ray Chambers was appointed to a senior lectureship in accounting in the Faculty of Economics, University of Sydney. There were, at that time, only two academic accounting journals that could make any claim to being research oriented, because accounting at the time was focused on practicality not research: The Accounting Review in the U.S. and Accounting Research in the U.K. Accounting Research had been published by Cambridge University Press for the Society of Incorporated Accountants’ Research Committee. In 1958, it was incorporated with the monthly professional journal Accountancy. Ray Chambers had concerns with the lack of outlets for accounting research. By that time, Accountancy had become the official journal of the Institute of Chartered Accountants in England and Wales (ICAEW). Chambers had been toying with the idea of creating an accounting journal and at the time the Institute of Chartered Accountants, had the right and title to the journal, ‘Accounting Research’.

Chambers wanted to use the title ‘Accounting Research’ for a new journal but his request was denied by the Institute of Chartered Accountants in England and Wales who held the right to the title. After some back and forth, Chambers gave up on using ‘Accounting Research’ and instead settled on the title ‘Abacus: A Journal of Accounting and Business Studies’.

Abacus was established in 1965 by Raymond J. Chambers. Abacus was published by the then newly formed Sydney University Press (SUP) which provided for a print run of 500 copies, twice a year. 1,500 copies of the first volume were printed, with half being distributed free as promotional copies. In the second year of publication 400 subscriptions had been received. Thereafter, the number of subscribers grew slowly, to 600 in 1967 and over 800 in 1969. After ten years, the journal was well established, as one of the leading academic accounting journals in the world. The subscription list was at about 1,200 at the time including institutional subscribers all spread over multiple countries.

Chambers remained the editor-in-chief until 1974 when he was succeeded by Murray Wells who principal editor from 1975 to 1994. Graeme W. Dean co-edited the journal with Wells from 1991 to 1994 and became the journal's principal editor until the end of 2009. He co-edited the journal with Stewart Jones from 2008 to 2009, and in 2009 Jones assumed the editorship of the journal. Two editors, Ron Brooker and Frank Clarke, served the journal for shorter periods.
