= Raymond J. Chambers =

Australian accountant

Raymond John Chambers (16 November 1917 – 13 September 1999), was an accounting academic who worked at the University of Sydney from 1953–1999. His research sought to provide an evidence-based reform of financial reporting and accounting practice.

Chambers was selected by Dick Edwards as one of his Twentieth Century Accounting Thinkers. Additionally, he was the first academic outside of North America to be inducted into the American Accounting Association’s Accounting Hall of Fame. He published nearly 300 articles, a dozen books and monographs, made over 100 submissions to the press and various public and professional accounting bodies, as well as delivering close to 400 lectures across the world. Accounting, Evaluation and Economic Behavior, Securities and Obscurities, and An Accounting Thesaurus are his most well-known book-length contributions.

Raymond J. Chambers also established Abacus, a peer-reviewed quarterly academic journal under the Accounting Foundation, University of Sydney in 1965. Chambers remained the editor-in-chief until 1974 when he was succeeded by Murray Wells.

== Early life and education ==
Chambers’ Yorkshire father, John emigrated to Australia in 1912 and married Louisa Moog. They lived in Newcastle and had two children, Raymond and Cyril Albert. Louisa died in the early 1920s and the children then lived with relatives. John remarried Esme Mabel May in the mid-1920s which allowed the children to return home. Chambers pursued secondary education at Newcastle Boys High, graduating in 1934 with what Chambers described as ‘modest grades’. In 1935 those grades enabled him to apply successfully for a Scholarship to attend the University of Sydney; he graduated in 1939 with a Bachelor of Economics degree....

== Academic career ==
While pursuing a University degree Chambers also enrolled part-time for an accounting certificate. He entered academia in late 1943, after having worked in the private sector at several companies, and the wartime Prices Commission set up by the Australian government to regulate prices. Chambers’ first academic appointment was as a Lecturer at Sydney Technical College (now part of the institution known as TAFE NSW). Chambers set up the first management education programmes in Australia and remained at the college until 1953, when he was appointed as the first full-time accounting position at the University of Sydney, a Senior Lecturer. This was followed by promotions to Associate Professor in 1955 and foundation Professor in 1960.

=== Contributions to Accounting Thought ===
Throughout the late 1950s, 1960s and 1970s, Chambers was an "internationalist" reformer – for over twenty years he travelled (often with his family which was unusual for an Antipodean academic at that time) first to Europe in 1959 and then to the USA (for a total of 4.5 years – out of those 20). He held several visiting professorships at various institutions such as the Universities of Chicago, California at Berkeley, Michigan Ann-Arbor, Florida, and Illinois at Urbana–Champaign, but he remained in permanent employment at the University of Sydney. The 1977 American Accounting Association study, Statement of Accounting Theory and Theory Acceptance described Chambers as a leading "golden age’ theoretician," recognizing his influence in promoting "decision usefulness" as a major purpose of accounting. He sought to rid accounting of its infelicities, its addiction to dogma; and to formulate a theoretically-based system of accounting founded on principles drawn from the domain of commerce – his conceptual framework. During the 1960s and 1970s through memberships of The Institute of Management Science and the Operations Research Society of America (later known as INFORMS) he mixed with US Accounting and Operations Research (OR) academics William Cooper and Ernest Weinwurm) who were then international leaders of the emerging OR discipline.

Chambers advocated an accounting having economic and social impacts. Being a system of mathematical and linguistic symbols accounting had the potential to ensure trust amongst market participants and facilitate wealth distribution among society. Given this, his market price-based theory sought a solution to two enduring related accounting puzzles – namely ‘the riddle of the money illusion’ and why its solution (what he called ‘the ideal’) had not been demanded for centuries by those in business relying on accounting.

While well known for his theorizing little is known about his practical experiences, especially his business consultancies that informed that theorizing. During the 1950s, 60s and seventies he provided advice in respect of many industries and myriad issues to major accounting and law firms, business associations and large public companies. Federal and State government departments also sought his advice in the form of expert opinions.

=== CoCoA system ===
Chambers proposed in the 1960s a market-based system of continuously contemporary accounting (CoCoA); an alternative to the conventional, historic cost accounting method. At a time when historic cost accounting concentrated on accounting from an “earnings viewpoint”—especially after adjusting for periodic cost allocations by recourse to what is described as the matching principle—Chambers adopted a “balance sheet” viewpoint in the calculation of income. His system articulated definitions of asset, liability, revenue, expense, distributions, contributions, and focused on specifying the “property” of assets and liabilities to be measured, namely their current cash equivalent. It also prescribed that changes in the purchasing power of money should be recognized in the accounts. In this regard, Chambers anticipated what is now widely known as the conceptual framework of accounting and the real (in an economics sense) exit price form of the present system known as fair value accounting.

=== Thesaurus of Accounting ===
Chambers was a practicing archivist as evidenced by his roles as secretary and committee member of the N.S.W. Division of the Business Archives of Australia from 1961–1969. His archivist tendencies resulted in the development of an extensive collection of correspondence, the Chambers Archive It presaged his An Accounting Thesaurus: Five Hundred Years of Accounting, which remains the only thesaurus of accounting. It has over 6,000 entries, Dewey-classified and cross-referenced.

=== Impact on the Practicing Arm of the Profession ===
Chambers was the first academic to be appointed as National President of one of the two major Australian professional bodies, CPA Australia (1977–78), having been a National Councillor for many years. In the 1960s together with Australian professorial contemporaries Russell Matthews and Lou Goldberg he oversaw several education initiatives, the differentiation of accounting education from training and ultimately changes to the entry requirements to the accounting profession that resulted in graduate entry to the profession in Australia. Chambers’ acknowledged theoretical and practical expertise led to his appointment as Chairman of the 1978 N.S.W. government-appointed Accounting Standards Review Committee whose brief was to examine and report on the Australian accounting profession’s promulgated accounting standards and to consider any other standards that might be useful for parties drawing on published accounting information.

=== Other administrative roles ===
At the University he served many administrative, teaching and research roles. He was a Fellow of Senate (1983–86 and Chairman, Finance Committee of Senate (1983–86), the first Treasurer of the University Staff Club (1961), Member of the Board (chairman 1960–63) of the University Co-Operative Bookshop, Committee member Sydney Association of University Teachers (1954–58), member of the Board of Sydney University Union (1961), University of Sydney Appointments Board (Chair 1963–70), University of Sydney Extensions Board member (1964–82). In 1960 he was appointed Foundation Professor of Accounting. In that capacity he developed curricula for the undergraduate, honours and postgraduate degree programs in accounting.

=== Retirement ===
Chambers officially retired in 1982, but was reappointed immediately for 1 year. For the next decade or more he was very productive in retirement. A collection of his articles was published as Chambers on Accounting; he codified his ideas on a conceptual Framework of Accounting which was published in 1991 in monograph form as Foundations of Accounting, and he finalized his extensive Accounting Thesaurus which was published in 1996, along with publishing several articles in leading accounting journals.

== Recognition ==
Chambers work was described using accolades such as an “accounting pioneer," an “intellectual giant” and "a rigorous theorist and prolific author whose impact was felt around the world." Chambers’ received numerous accolades, three honorary doctorates, and induction into Ohio State University's U.S. Accounting Hall of Fame (now part of the American Accounting Association) in 1991. He was the first non-U.S. academic to be inducted. He was an inaugural inductee into the University of Melbourne Australian Accounting Hall of Fame in 2010. Other awards included: in 1958 being the first recipient of the ASA’s Citation for Meritorious Contribution to the Literature of Accounting, Accounting and Action, and in 1967 the AICPA’s Gold Medal for outstanding contribution to accounting literature, Accounting, Evaluation and Economic Behavior. In 1978 he was awarded the Order of Australia for services to commerce and education, particularly in accounting and business management.

== Personal life ==
Chambers married Margaret Scott Brown. They had met whilst attending Christadelphian church gatherings. Later, Chambers became an occasional lay-preacher. Ray and Margaret lived together for 60 years, with three children, Margaret, Rosemary, Kevin and several grandchildren.

== Selected publications ==
- Chambers, R. J., 1955. Blueprint for a Theory of Accounting. Accounting Research, 6:1, 17–25.
- Chambers, R. J., 1961. Towards a General Theory of Accounting. ASA Annual Research Lecture, University of Adelaide, 2 August, published as a booklet, 30 June, 48 pp.
- Chambers, R. J. (1966). Accounting, Evaluation and Economic Behavior. Englewood Cliffs, NJ: Prentice-Hall.
- Chambers, R. J. (1973). Securities and Obscurities: A Case for Reform of the Law of Company Accounts. Melbourne: Gower Press.
- Chambers, R. J. (Ed.) (1995). An Accounting Thesaurus: 500 Years of Accounting. Oxford: Pergamon.
- Chambers, R. J., 2000. Aide-Memoire. Abacus, 36:3, 334–86.
- Chambers, R. J., 1961. Towards a General Theory of Accounting. ASA Annual Research Lecture, University of Adelaide, 2 August, published as a booklet, 30 June, 48 pp.
- Chambers, Richard (1995). An Accounting Thesarus: 500 Years of Accounting. Pergamom. ISBN 9780080425733.
