= Accounting and Finance Association of Australia and New Zealand =

Professional non-profit organization

- Abbreviation: AFAANZ
- Formation: 1960
- Type: Association
- Headquarters: Melbourne, Australia
- Region served: Australia and New Zealand
- President (Australia): Jacqueline Birt
- President (New Zealand): Tom Scott

Accounting and Finance Association of Australia and New Zealand (AFAANZ) is a professional not-for-profit association founded in 1960 with the current name established in 2002 as an amalgamation of the Accounting Association of Australia and New Zealand (AAANZ) and the Australian Association of University Teachers in Accounting (AAUTA). The organization represents the interests of people in Australia and New Zealand who are involved in education of accounting and finance.

According to AFAANZ, it runs events such as conferences, doctoral symposiums, and forums on the study of finance and accounting. AFAANZ also stated that it publishes a journal that aims to promote public information and research related to accounting and finance and on its grant programme. AFAANZ claims that the association has over 850 members.

== Purpose ==
According to AFAANZ's website, the organisation's mission is: "To improve accounting and finance education and research in Australia and New Zealand by increasing the quality of academic staff in accounting and finance disciplines, retaining quality academics in Australia and New Zealand, [and] promoting the accounting and finance profession."

AFAANZ serves the scholarly interests of accounting and finance academics and aims to establish new research and disseminate information in the Australian and New Zealand regions to strengthen the fields. The association also aims to educate the public in the accounting, finance, and related disciplines via journals, discussions, lectures, and events.

== Charity status ==
AFAANZ is a registered charity with the Australian Charities and Not-for-profits Commission. AFAANZ stated on the charity register that it helps "financially disadvantaged people, overseas communities or charities, [and the] general community in Australia".

AFAANZ's operational role as a charity is the advancement of accounting and finance education. The research grants provided by AFAANZ are distributed annually and encourage study in accounting and finance. Andrew Jackson is the treasurer. The Australian Charities and Not-for-profits Commission reports that AFAANZ had an income of $880,788 and that expenses totaled to $855,894 for the year ended 31 December 2019.

In 2019, AFAANZ supported PhD students to attend the European Accounting Association's Colloquium and the American Accounting Association's Consortium as well as funding AFDEN, a PhD coursework program.

As a charity, AFAANZ has one full-time employee, one casual employee, and ten volunteer workers. Total employee expenses amounted to $108,909 for the year ended 31 December 2019, which represented 12% of revenue.

== Education ==
The AFAANZ Doctoral Education Network (AFDEN) aims to assist doctoral candidates in accounting and finance and related fields throughout their first year of study. AFDEN helps with the costs of pursuing a doctorate by awarding scholarships to successful applicants that are intended to be used for travel costs associated with attending necessary coursework at international universities. Although AFDEN doesn't claim to grant degrees or its own coursework, they offer a network for accounting and finance doctoral candidates to interact throughout the Australian and New Zealand regions. The program aims to prepare high quality dissertations and find a suitable academic career path.

AFAANZ also run a doctoral symposium to facilitate the work of PhD candidates. The symposium allows candidates to present an overview of their research and receive feedback from other doctoral students and professors in their respective fields.

In 2020 AFAANZ partnered with the Chartered Accountants Australia and New Zealand (CAANZ) to create the Education Technology Symposium from November 19 to November 20. The forum is interactive and held virtually for those interested in teaching via technology and expanding their technological skills in their classes.

== Publication of academic journals ==
AFAANZ publishes two journals annually, Accounting & Finance and Accounting History.

=== Accounting & Finance ===
Accounting & Finance is an academic journal that publishes articles addressing significant research questions from a range of perspectives that contribute to accounting, finance, and business information systems. The journal is aimed at academics, graduate students and those interested in research in accounting and finance. A range of theoretical, empirical, and experimental papers are included. Volumes are published annually with various issues updated throughout the year, the most current version being Volume 60, Issue 3 published in September 2020. The journal is subscription-based, edited by Tom Smith and published by Wiley-Blackwell. In 2019 Sarah Osborne's “Abnormal returns and asymmetric information surrounding strategic and financial acquisitions” was awarded the Peter Brownell Award for best article.

=== Accounting History ===
Accounting History is a peer-reviewed journal edited by Professor Carolyn Cordery and associate professors Carolyn Fowler and Laura Maran that publishes historical papers exploring the nature, uses, roles, rules and practices of accounting. Accounting history is internationally recognized as a research journal that seeks to advance the knowledge of accounting and the relevant cultural and political environments in historical contexts. Specifically the journal publishes papers that look to critically interpret historical practices of accounting and their impacts while also promoting study of the subject. A range of topics and methodologies are included such as biography, institutional history, comparative international accounting history, as well as creative research methods. Accounting History has a Google Scholar H5-index of 12 and a CiteScore rating of 2.400 where it is also ranked 29 out of 1259 in the "history" category and 57 out of 154 in the "accounting" category. The first issue was published in May 1996, and the most current version is Volume 25, Issue 4 published in November 2020.

== Annual conference ==
AFAANZ hosts an annual conference located in various cities throughout the Australian and New Zealand Region. The conference encourages those in the accounting and finance fields to network with researchers and colleagues, as well as hear from the plenary speakers on research ideas. A call is issued early each year for academic papers broadly in accounting and finance to be peer reviewed and disseminated at the conference, which takes place in July. Both new and seasoned academics are encouraged to participate and disseminate their work.

The AFAANZ 2020 conference was held from the 5th to the 6th of July and was the first virtually hosted conference due to COVID-19 restrictions. Chartered Accountants Australia and New Zealand acted as platinum sponsors and CPA Australia were the gold sponsors.

The 2021 conference will be held in Melbourne, Australia from the 4th-6 July where the association will celebrate its 60th anniversary. The two plenary speakers planning to be in attendance are life member and past president of AFAANZ Gary Monroe and professor of accounting at Dartmouth College Phillip Stocken.

=== List of past conferences ===
- 2020: held virtually
- 2019: Brisbane, Australia, 7–9 July
- 2018: Auckland, New Zealand, 1–3 July
- 2017: Adelaide, Australia, 2–4 July
- 2016: Gold Coast, Australia, 3–5 July
- 2015: Hobart, Australia, 5–7 July
- 2014: Auckland, New Zealand, 6–8 July
- 2013: Perth, Australia, 7–9 July
- 2012: Melbourne, Australia, 1–3 July
- 2011: Darwin, Australia, 3–5 July
- 2010: Christchurch, New Zealand, 4–6 July
- 2009: Adelaide, Australia, 5–7 July
- 2008: Sydney, Australia, 6–8 July
- 2007: Gold Coast, Australia, 1–3 July
- 2006: Wellington, New Zealand, 2–4 July
- 2005: Melbourne, Australia, 3–5 July

== Membership ==
AFAANZ offers both institutional and individual memberships. Both aim to provide members with networking, scholarship and research grant opportunities to those interested in accounting and finance. The individual membership can be purchased with or without a journal subscription, and there is also the option for a PhD student membership. Institutional memberships are available to universities to facilitate researching and teaching in the accounting and finance fields. These universities include the Australian National University, University of Otago, University of New South Wales, Victoria University of Wellington, and University of Sydney.

=== Notable members ===
Professor Kenneth Trotman is a life member of AFAANZ and was appointed a Member of the Order of Australia (AM) for his work in accounting education. Professor Trotman is an internationally published professor at the Business School in the University of New South Wales and was inducted to the Australian Accounting Hall of Fame in 2011.

AFAANZ member Roger Simnett delivered the first plenary session at the AFAANZ annual conference in 2019. Simnett is a Scientia accounting professor at the University of New South Wales Business School as well as the chair and CEO of the Australian Auditing and Assurance Standards Board. He has over 80 publications in a number of well-regarded journals including The Accounting Review, Accounting, and Organizations and Society. In 2011, he was awarded the Outstanding Contribution to Accounting & Finance Practice award and in 2015 was awarded the Outstanding Contribution to Accounting & Finance Research Literature award, both by AFAANZ.

Emeritus Professor Jayne Godfrey is a life member of AFAANZ and received an Australian Centenary Medal for her work, as well as the 2008 AFAANZ award for Outstanding Contributions to Accounting and Finance Practice.

The Australian president of AFAANZ is Jacqueline Birt and the New Zealand president is Tom Scott.

== Financials ==
AFAANZ's financial report published December 31, 2019 provides an overview of the association's financial information. The total comprehensive income for the year ended 2019 was $24,894. Gross revenue came to $880,788, 81.72% of which was acquired from the sale of goods and services, 1.36% from income investments, and 16.92% from other revenue streams. Approximately $225,000 in research grants was awarded to successful candidates in 2019. AFAANZ has seen an average annual growth rate of 2% in revenue and has a debt to equity ratio of 0.23. The company's balance sheet reports its assets total to $1,406,696 and total liabilities come to $328,532, making their net assets worth $1,078,164.
