= Accounting History =

- Discipline: History of accounting
- Language: English
- Edited by: Carolyn Fowler, Carolyn Cordery and Laura Maran

Publication details
- History: 1996-present
- Publisher: SAGE Publications on behalf of the Accounting History Special Interest Group of the Accounting and Finance Association of Australia and New Zealand
- Frequency: Quarterly

Standard abbreviations
- ISO 4: Account. Hist.

Indexing
- ISSN: 1032-3732 (print); 1749-3374 (web)
- LCCN: 2003207141
- OCLC no.: 173408857

Links
- Journal homepage; Online access; Online archive

Accounting History is a quarterly peer-reviewed academic journal that covers the history of accounting. The journal's editors-in-chief are Carolyn Fowler (Victoria University of Wellington), Carolyn Cordery (Aston University) and Laura Maran (RMIT University).

It was established in 1996 and is published by SAGE Publications in association with the Accounting History Special Interest Group of the Accounting and Finance Association of Australia and New Zealand. The academic journal motivates the use of accounting and offers various forums pertaining to organization in the field. The journal inspires the accounting practice which serves to recognize its role in other relevant disciplines.

== Topics ==
Accounting History covers a wide variety of topics in the field of accounting. In the article, there are many topics of papers chronicling histories, the records of accounting, and theories about accounting. These topics are covered to further initiate more research or discussion in the field of accounting.

== Aims and goals ==
The aim of the Accounting History journal identifies how the accounting field communicates in today's context. The journal offer's articles with competing points-of-view about the past history of accounting.

- Recognize the factors that are time-sensitive and can impact the effect the accounting
- Assess accounting's role in society and organizational role
- Offers the accounting insight through an interpretive viewpoint
- Relates the differences of each field of accounting to a variety of discourses

== See also ==
- Accounting History Review
