= Cheryl S. McWatters =

Cheryl S. McWatters is professor and Father Edgar Thivierge Chair in Business History at the Telfer School of Management, University of Ottawa.

== Education and career ==
She was previously a professor at the University of Alberta and associate professor at McGill University. McWatters is a qualified accountant and earned her B.A., M.B.A. and Ph.D. all from Queen's University, Kingston, Ontario. Her work relates primarily to seventeenth and eighteenth century international trading networks. She is a trustee and former president of the Academy of Accounting Historians. McWatters established the Geraldine Grace and Maurice Alvin McWatters Visiting Fellowship at Queen's University in memory of her parents.

== Editing ==
McWatters is editor of Accounting History Review and associate editor of the Journal of Operations Management and Accounting Perspectives. She serves on the editorial boards of Accounting, Auditing and Accountability Journal and Accounting Historians Journal.

== Awards ==
- Shingo Research Prize for Excellence in Manufacturing Research.

== Selected publications ==
- Histoire des entreprises du transport: Évolutions comptables et managériales. Paris, France: L'Harmattan - Presses Universitaires de Sceaux, 2010. (Editor with H. Zimnovitch)
- Management Accounting: Analysis and Interpretation. Pearson Education, Harlow, 2008. (Editor with J.L. Zimmerman and D.C. Morse)
