= Christian Leuz =

German business economist

Christian Leuz (born 1967) is a German business economist, specializing in finance, accounting, and institutional economics. He is the Charles F. Pohl Distinguished Service Professor of Accounting and Finance at the University of Chicago Booth School of Business.

Leuz began his studies at Goethe University Frankfurt, Germany where he studied business economics. At the University of Wisconsin, Madison, he received an M.S. in Finance and Management before returning to Germany to pursue his PhD studies. In 1996 he received his PhD in business economics, summa cum laude, and in 2000 he received his Habilitation (German post-doctorate degree) from Goethe University Frankfurt.

Leuz's research examines the role of corporate disclosures, accounting transparency and disclosure regulation in capital markets, corporate governance and corporate financing. He currently serves as an editor of the Journal of Accounting Research. and as a co-director of Chicago Booth's Initiative on Global Markets. He is a research associate at the National Bureau of Economic Research and a Fellow at the European Corporate Governance Institute, Wharton's Financial Institution Center, Goethe University's Center for Financial Studies, and in the CESifo Research Network. He also serves as an economic advisor to the Public Company Accounting Oversight Board.

== Awards ==
Leuz was recently recognized as a “Highly Cited Researchers" by Thomson Reuters and included in their list of “The World’s Most Influential Scientific Minds 2014.” He is listed in the category 'Economics and Business'". Leuz was also recently awarded the "Distinguished Contributions to Accounting Literature Award," 2014 by the American Accounting Association for his paper "Earnings management and investor protection: an international comparison."

Other notable awards that Leuz has received include the 2010 Notable Contributions to Accounting Literature Award (with Luzi Hail) from the American Accounting Association and, in 2012, the prestigious little Humboldt Research Award ("kleiner Humboldtpreis") in recognition of the impact his work has had on the field of business economics.
