= Jayne Godfrey =

Australian professor of business and economics

- Born: 1956

Academic background
- Education: University of Sydney, University of Queensland
- Thesis: Accounting for foreign currency : an efficient contracting portfolio approach (1990)

Jayne Maree Godfrey is an Australian business and accounting academic, and is an emeritus professor at the Australian National University, specialising in accounting regulation and sustainability accounting and reporting.

== Academic career ==
Godfrey completed a Bachelor of Commerce at the University of Melbourne, a Master of Economics at the University of Sydney, and a PhD titled Accounting for foreign currency: an efficient contracting portfolio approach at the University of Queensland. Godfrey joined the Faculty of Business and Economics at Monash University in 2008, and then moved to the College of Business and Economics at Australian National University in 2011. Godfrey was Dean of the University of Auckland Business School from 2017 to 2020. Godfrey is the director of the Analytics Institute of Australia, and professor emeritus at Australian National University.

Godfrey is a member of a number of boards, including the Australian Accounting Standards Board, the Water Accounting Standards Board, and the Sir Roland Wilson Foundation Board.

She has served as President of the Accounting and Finance Association of Australia and New Zealand.

Godfrey's research focuses on accounting regulation, sustainability accounting and reporting, and the impacts of accounting policy. Godfrey led a process to develop a water accounting standard for Australia, based on an Intergovernmental Agreement on a National Water Initiative.

== Honours and awards ==
In 2001 Godfrey was awarded an Australian Centenary Medal for service to Australian society in business leadership. The same year she won a Telstra Businesswoman of the Year award in the Corporate and Government section.

Godfrey was elected a life member of the Accounting and Finance Association of Australia and New Zealand for her service to the academic accounting profession, and won the 2008 AFAANZ Award for Outstanding Contributions to Accounting and Finance Practice.

== Selected works ==
- PETER COLLETT; Godfrey, Jayne Maree; SUE HRASKY (1998). "Standard‐setting in Australia: Implications of Recent Radical Reform Proposals". Australian Accounting Review. 8 (16): 9–17. doi:10.1111/j.1835-2561.1998.tb00084.x. Wikidata Q130312559.
- Godfrey, Jayne Maree; Kerrie L. Jones (1999). "Political cost influences on income smoothing via extraordinary item classification". Accounting and Finance. 39 (3): 229–253. doi:10.1111/1467-629x.00025. Wikidata Q130312547.
- Maryanne Slattery; Keryn Chalmers; Godfrey, Jayne Maree (2012). "Beyond the Hydrographers' Legacy: Water Accounting in Australia". doi:10.4337/9781849807500.00009. Wikidata Q130312585 http://dx.doi.org/10.4337/9781849807500.00009.
- Godfrey, Jayne Maree (2012). Water Accounting: International Approaches to Policy and Decision-making. doi:10.4337/9781849807500. ISBN 978-1-84980-750-0. Wikidata Q130312583.
- Godfrey, Jayne Maree (2004). China's Business Reforms: Institutional Challenges in a Globalised Economy. Routledge. doi:10.4324/9780203537039. ISBN 978-1-134-28326-2. Wikidata Q130312582.
- Steven F. Cahan; Godfrey, Jayne Maree; Hamilton, Jane; Debra C. Jeter (2013). "The Association between Client-Specific Investment Opportunities and Audit Fees of Industry Specialists". SSRN. doi:10.2139/ssrn.2321690. Wikidata Q130312578.
- Godfrey, Professor Jayne M.; Freeman, Molly (6 August 2019). "Why business matters". Newsroom.
