= Olivia S. Mitchell =

American economist (born 1953)

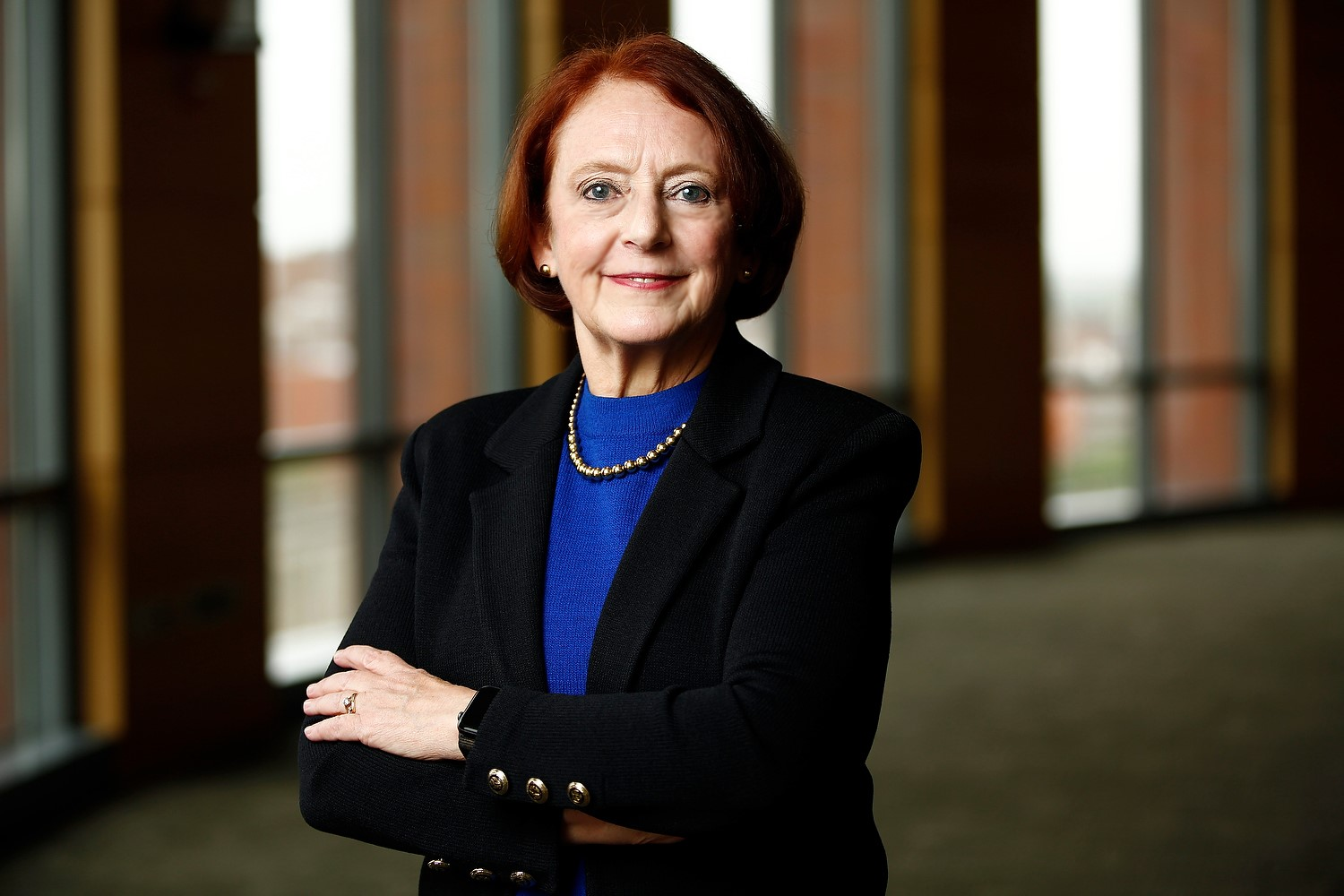

Academic work
- Discipline: Economics
- Institutions: Cornell University; The Wharton School of the University of Pennsylvania
- Awards: Distinguished Fellow, American Economic Association, 2023; FINRA Investor Education Foundation Ketchum Prize, 2019; ICA 2018 Best Paper Award, 2017; Robert C Witt Award for Best Paper in the Journal of Risk and Insurance, 2021 and 2017; EBRI Lillywhite Award, 2017; Q-Group Roger F. Murray Award, 2016; CRAIN Top 100 Innovators, Disruptors, and Change-Makers in Business, 2016; Top 10 Women Economists, World Economic Forum, 2015; Carolyn Bell Shaw Award, 2007

Olivia S. Mitchell (born 1953) is an American economist and the International Foundation of Employee Benefit Plans Professor at The Wharton School of the University of Pennsylvania. Her interests focus on pensions and social security, and she is the executive director of the Pension Research Council, the oldest U.S. center devoted to scholarship and policy-relevant research on retirement security. She also heads Wharton's Boettner Center for Pensions and Retirement Research.

== Career ==
Mitchell joined The Wharton School of the University of Pennsylvania in 1993, having served from 1978 to 1993 as a professor at Cornell University; she also visited Harvard, Goethe University, Singapore Management University, and the University of New South Wales. She serves as an Independent Director for the Allspring Funds Board of Trustees, and is a member of the National Bureau of Economic Research. She has served on the advisory board to the Singaporean Central Provident Fund, the executive board of the American Economic Association and chaired the Committee on the Status of Women in the Economics Profession. In 2001 she served on the bipartisan President's Commission to Strengthen Social Security. She is co-Principal Investigator for the Health and Retirement Study. In 2002 and again in 2010, she was the Metzler Bank Visiting Professor at Goethe University. At Wharton, she is a professor of Business Economics and Public Policy, and Insurance and Risk Management.

== Education ==
Mitchell earned her BA in Economics with honors from Harvard University and her MS and Ph.D. degrees in economics from the University of Wisconsin–Madison. She also received honorary degrees from the University of Pennsylvania, the University of St. Gallen, and Goethe University Frankfurt.

== Works ==
Mitchell has published widely on pensions, social security reform, retirement security, and financial literacy. Her work is highly regarded: in 2018, her paper was awarded the Best Paper Award on Behavioral Aspects of Insurance Mathematics, and in 2017 and again in 2021 she received the Robert C Witt Award for Best Paper in the Journal of Risk and Insurance; she also received the EBRI Lillywhite Award the same year. In 2008 and again in 2017 she was awarded the Roger F. Murray Prize from the Institute for Quantitative Research in Finance. In 2016 she was selected as a CRAIN "Top 100 Innovators, Disruptors, and Change-Makers in Business", while in 2011 she was named one of the “25 Most Influential People” and “50 Top Women in Wealth” by Investment Advisor Magazine; in 2010 she received the Retirement Income Industry Association Award for Achievement in Applied Retirement Research. In 2008 Mitchell received the Carolyn Shaw Bell Award from the Committee on the Status of Women in the Economics Profession, and in 2007 she received the Fidelity Pyramid Research Institute Prize for her co-authored study on financial literacy. In 2003 she received the Premio Internazionale dell'Istituto Nazionale delle Assicurazioni, awarded at the Accademia Nazionale dei Lincei in Rome, Italy, and in 1999 her co-authored work received the Paul A. Samuelson Award for Scholarly Writing on Lifelong Financial Security from TIAA-CREF. Mitchell was named a Distinguished Fellow of the American Economic Association in 2023.

=== Selected recent academic articles ===
- Lusardi, Annamaria and Olivia S. Mitchell. (2023). “The Importance of Financial Literacy: Opening a New Field.” Journal of Economic Perspectives, 27(4):137-154.
- Lusardi, Annamaria, Pierre-Carl Michaud, and Olivia S. Mitchell. (2017). “Optimal Financial Literacy and Wealth Inequality.” Journal of Political Economy, 125(2): 431–477.
- Brown, Jeffrey R., Arie Kapteyn, Erzo Luttmer, and Olivia S. Mitchell. (2017). “Cognitive Constraints on Valuing Annuities.” Journal of the European Economic Association, 15(2): 429–462.
- Maurer, Raimond, Olivia S. Mitchell, Ralph Rogalla, and Ivonne Siegelin. (2016). “Accounting and Actuarial Smoothing of Retirement Payouts in Participating Life Annuities.” Insurance: Mathematics and Economics, 71: 268–283.
- Kim, Hugh Hoikwang, Raimond Maurer, and Olivia S. Mitchell. (2016). “Time is Money: Rational Life Cycle Inertia and the Delegation of Investment Management.” Journal of Financial Economics, 121(2): 231–448.
- Dimmock, Stephen G., Roy Kouwenberg, Olivia S. Mitchell and Kim Peijnenburg. (2016). “Ambiguity Aversion and Household Portfolio Choice Puzzles: Empirical Evidence.” Journal of Financial Economics, 119(3): 559–577.
- Brown, Jeffrey R., Arie Kapteyn, and Olivia S. Mitchell. (2016). “Framing and Claiming: How Information Framing Affects Expected Social Security Claiming Behavior.” Journal of Risk and Insurance, 83(1): 139–162.
- Hubener, Andreas, Raimond Maurer, and Olivia S. Mitchell. (2015) “How Family Status and Social Security Claiming Options Shape Optimal Life Cycle Portfolios.” Review of Financial Studies, 29(1): 937–978.

=== Selected books ===
- P. Brett Hammond, Raimond Maurer and Olivia S. Mitchell, eds. "Pension Funds and Sustainable Investment: Challenges and Opportunities". Oxford University Press. 2023.
- Olivia S. Mitchell, P. Brett Hammond, and Stephen Utkus, eds. "Financial Decision Making and Retirement Security in an Aging World". Oxford University Press. 2017.
- Olivia S. Mitchell, Raimond Maurer, and J. Michael Orszag, eds. "Retirement System Risk Management: Implications of the New Regulatory Order". Oxford University Press. 2016.
- Olivia S. Mitchell and Kent Smetters. "The Market for Retirement Financial Advice". Oxford University Press. 2013
- Raimond Maurer, Olivia S. Mitchell, and Mark Warshawsky, eds. "Reshaping Retirement Security: Lessons from the Global Financial Crisis". Oxford University Press. 2012.
- Olivia S. Mitchell and Annamaria Lusardi, eds. "Financial Literacy". Oxford University Press. 2011.
- Olivia S. Mitchell, John Piggott, and Noriyuki Takayama, eds. "Securing Lifelong Retirement Income". Oxford University Press. 2011.
- Mitchell, Olivia S.; Anderson, Gary W., eds. (2009). The Future of Public Employee Retirement Systems. Oxford University Press.
- Olivia S. Mitchell and Stephen P. Utkus, eds. "Pension Design and Structure: New Lessons from Behavioral Finance". Oxford, UK: Oxford University Press, 2004.
- Brown, Jeffrey; Mitchell, Olivia S.; Poterba, James; Warshawsky, Mark (2001). The Role of Annuity Markets in Financing Retirement. MIT Press.
