= Stefan Reichelstein =

German economist

Stefan J. Reichelstein
- Born: 1957 (age 68–69)
- Known for: Management accounting, energy economics, corporate carbon accounting

Academic background
- Education: University of Bonn; Northwestern University

Academic work
- Institutions: University of Mannheim; Stanford Graduate School of Business; University of California, Berkeley; University of Vienna

Stefan J. Reichelstein (born 1957) is a German economist and academic. He is Professor of Business Administration at the University of Mannheim, where he directs the Mannheim Institute for Sustainable Energy Studies (MISES). He is the William R. Timken Professor of Accounting, Emeritus, at the Stanford Graduate School of Business. He also served as President of European School of Management and Technology.

Reichelstein's research has focused on the intersection of management accounting and economics, particularly cost and profitability analysis, decentralization, internal pricing, and performance measurement. His later work has examined the economics of low-carbon energy and corporate carbon accounting.

== Early life and education ==
Reichelstein studied economics at the University of Bonn, completing a pre-diploma in 1977. He studied managerial economics at Northwestern University's Kellogg School of Management, where he received an M.S. in 1980 and a Ph.D. in 1984.

== Academic career ==
Reichelstein began his academic career as an assistant professor at the Haas School of Business at the University of California, Berkeley in 1982. He also held faculty positions at the Stanford Graduate School of Business, the University of Vienna, and UC Berkeley before returning to Stanford.

He was appointed William R. Timken Professor of Accounting at Stanford in 2002 and became professor emeritus in 2018. In July 2018, he joined the University of Mannheim as an endowed professor of business administration and began building the Mannheim Institute for Sustainable Energy Studies.

The Review of Accounting Studies was established in 1994 by a group of founding editors that included Reichelstein, Gerald Feltham, John S. Hughes, James Ohlson, and Stephen Penman. A retrospective of the journal's history published in 2024 also identifies Reichelstein among its early managing editors.

== Research ==
Reichelstein's research has examined the economic foundations of management accounting, including performance measurement, investment decisions, decentralization, internal pricing, and organizational incentives.

His 1992 paper with Nahum Melumad and Dilip Mookherjee, A Theory of Responsibility Centers, examined the use of cost and profit centers within organizations. The paper developed a principal–agent model in which responsibility-center structures could provide incentives while allowing a principal to delegate contracting and coordination responsibilities.

In a 2007 Stanford GSB discussion of his research with Mark Soliman, Reichelstein examined the economic meaning of commonly used return-on-investment measures and their relationship to the internal rate of return of investment projects.

He studied the economics of battery storage with Stephen Comello, using a levelized-cost framework. Their work was published in Nature Communications in 2019.

A 2019 study in Nature Energy found that renewable hydrogen could already be competitive in some niche applications, although it was not yet competitive with industrial-scale hydrogen supply under the conditions studied.

His 2024 article in Review of Accounting Studies, Corporate Carbon Accounting: Balance Sheets and Flow Statements, proposed applying concepts from financial accounting to carbon emissions. The proposed system uses balance-sheet and flow-statement concepts to distinguish accumulated emissions from emissions associated with a particular reporting period.

== Honors and recognition ==
Reichelstein was appointed an honorary professor at the University of Vienna in 2007 and received honorary doctorates from the University of Fribourg in 2008 and the University of Mannheim in 2011.

He was awarded the Yuji Ijiri Distinguished Lectureship in Accounting in 2013.

In 2012, Reichelstein was elected a member of the Berlin-Brandenburg Academy of Sciences and Humanities.

In March 2026, the University of Vienna awarded Reichelstein an honorary doctorate for his contributions to business administration.

== Selected publications ==
- Melumad, Nahum; Mookherjee, Dilip; Reichelstein, Stefan (1992). "A theory of responsibility centers". Journal of Accounting and Economics. 15 (4): 445–484. doi:10.1016/0165-4101(92)90002-J.
- Reichelstein, Stefan (1997). "Investment decisions and managerial performance evaluation". Review of Accounting Studies. 2: 157–180. doi:10.1023/A:1018376808228.
- Reichelstein, Stefan (2000). "Providing managerial incentives: Cash flows versus accrual accounting". Journal of Accounting Research. 38 (2): 243–269.
- Reichelstein, Stefan; Rohlfing-Bastian, Andreas (2015). "Levelized Product Cost: Concept and Decision Relevance". The Accounting Review. 90 (4): 1653–1682. doi:10.2308/accr-51009.
- Comello, Stephen; Reichelstein, Stefan (2019). "The emergence of cost effective battery storage". Nature Communications. 10. doi:10.1038/s41467-019-09988-z.
- Glenk, Gunther; Reichelstein, Stefan (2019). "Economics of converting renewable power to hydrogen". Nature Energy. 4: 216–222. doi:10.1038/s41560-019-0326-1.
- Glenk, Gunther; Reichelstein, Stefan (2022). "Reversible Power-to-Gas systems for energy conversion and storage". Nature Communications. 13. doi:10.1038/s41467-022-29520-0.
- Reichelstein, Stefan (2024). "Corporate carbon accounting: balance sheets and flow statements". Review of Accounting Studies. 29 (3): 2125–2156. doi:10.1007/s11142-024-09830-y.
- Reichelstein, Stefan (2025). "Innovations in Corporate Carbon Accounting". Foundations and Trends in Accounting. 19 (3–4): 9–45. doi:10.1561/1400000080-2.
