= Contemporary Accounting Research =

- Discipline: Accounting
- Language: English, French
- Edited by: Alan Webb

Publication details
- History: 1984-present
- Publisher: Wiley on behalf of the Canadian Academic Accounting Association
- Frequency: Quarterly
- Impact factor: 2.026 (2019)

Standard abbreviations
- ISO 4: Contemp. Account. Res.

Indexing
- ISSN: 0823-9150 (print); 1911-3846 (web)
- OCLC no.: 612112250

Links
- Journal homepage

Contemporary Accounting Research is a peer-reviewed academic journal covering research on all aspects of accounting's role within organizations, markets, or society. The journal publishes articles in all areas of accounting, (including audit, financial, information systems, and tax), using relevant methods (including analytical, archival, case study, empirical, experimental, or field); based on economics, finance, history, psychology, sociology, or any cognate disciplines.

Contemporary Accounting Research is published by Wiley on behalf of the Canadian Academic Accounting Association. The editor-in-chief is Alan Webb (University of Waterloo). The journal is listed as one of the 45 journals used by the Financial Times to compile its business-school research ranks. According to the Journal Citation Reports, the journal has a 2019 impact factor of 2.026.
