= Journal of Business Finance & Accounting =

- Discipline: Accounting, finance
- Language: English
- Edited by: Peter F. Pope, Andrew Stark

Publication details
- History: 1974-present
- Publisher: John Wiley & Sons
- Frequency: 10/year
- Impact factor: 1.541 (2018)

Standard abbreviations
- ISO 4: J. Bus. Finance Account.

Indexing
- ISSN: 0306-686X (print); 1468-5957 (web)
- LCCN: 82644503
- OCLC no.: 37772888

Links
- Journal homepage; Online access; Online archive

The Journal of Business Finance & Accounting is a peer-reviewed academic journal published by John Wiley & Sons. It covers accounting, corporate finance, corporate governance, and their interfaces. The current editors-in-chief are Peter F. Pope (Bocconi University and London School of Economics and Political Science) and Andrew Stark (Manchester Business School).

== Abstracting and indexing ==
The journal is abstracted and indexed in the Social Sciences Citation Index, Scopus, ProQuest, EconLit, the International Bibliography of the Social Sciences, Emerald Management Reviews, and Research Papers in Economics. According to the 2018 Journal Citation Reports, the journal has an impact factor of 1.541, ranking it 39th out of 98 journals in the category "Business, Finance".

== Capital Markets Conference ==
Since 1992, the journal has held an annual Capital Markets Conference, which is sponsored by John Wiley & Sons and KPMG. Papers that are accepted for the conference are subsequently published in a special issue of the journal.
