= Accounting Perspectives =

- Discipline: Accounting, education, business, financial accounting, auditing
- Language: English, French
- Edited by: Leslie Berger

Publication details
- Former name: Canadian Accounting Perspectives
- History: 2002–present
- Publisher: Wiley-Blackwell on behalf of The Canadian Academic Accounting Association (Canada)
- Frequency: Quarterly

Standard abbreviations
- ISO 4: Account. Perspect.

Indexing
- ISSN: 1499-8653 (print); 1911-3838 (web)
- OCLC no.: 223531195

Links
- Journal homepage; Online access; Online archive

Accounting Perspectives (French: Perspectives comptables) is an academic journal published by Wiley-Blackwell on behalf of The Canadian Academic Accounting Association. Accounting Perspectives is a peer-reviewed journal publishing writing on the methods and practices of accounting research, policy, and education in Canada. The journal publishes research, literature reviews, commentary, educational articles, and instructional cases. Submissions may refer to data, resources, literature, or other materials outside the Canadian landscape. However, authors must be able to demonstrate the relevance of their work to the Canadian context.

The journal was established in 2002 as Canadian Accounting Perspectives and obtained its current title in 2007. Also in 2007, Accounting Perspectives took over the publication of accounting cases previously offered by Journal of Accounting Case Research. The last issue of the latter journal (volume 9, issue 2) was published by Captus Press and the University of Lethbridge.

Accounting Perspectives is abstracted and indexed in Scopus.
