= Accounting History Review =

- Discipline: History of accounting
- Language: English

Publication details
- Former names: Accounting, Business and Financial History
- History: 1990
- Publisher: Routledge
- Frequency: Triannually

Standard abbreviations
- ISO 4: Account. Hist. Rev.

Indexing
- ISSN: 2155-2851 (print); 2155-286X (web)

Links
- Journal homepage

Accounting History Review is a triannual peer-reviewed academic journal covering the history of accounting published by Routledge. It was formerly known as Accounting, Business and Financial History and was started in 1990. In 2011 the journal was renamed as Accounting History Review. The editor is Cheryl S. McWatters (University of Ottawa).

== Abstracting and indexing ==
The journal is abstracted and indexed in

- ABC-Clio/America History and Life;
- ABI/Inform;
- Cabell's Directory;
- EBSCO (Business Source Corporate, Business Source Elite, Business Source Premier);
- Historical Abstracts;
- IBSS (International Bibliography of the Social Sciences);
- IBZ (International Bibliography of Periodical Literature);
- Journal of Economic Literature (Econlit);
- K.G. Saur Verlag;
- OCLC ArticleFirst Database and OCLC FirstSearch Electronic Collections Online;
- Scopus;
- Swets Information Services;
- Thomson Gale.

== See also ==
- Accounting History
