= Eugene McWatters =

American serial killer

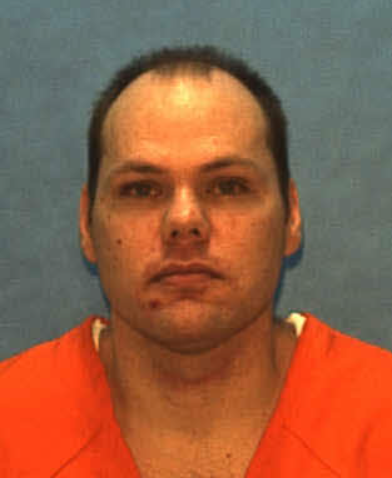
- McWatters in 2013
- Born: Eugene Wayman McWatters Jr. June 20, 1978; Port Salerno, Florida, U.S.
- Died: September 9, 2024 (aged 46); Central Florida Reception Center, Orlando, Florida, U.S.
- Other name: "The Salerno Strangler"
- Conviction: First degree murder (3 counts)
- Penalty: Death; commuted to life imprisonment

Details
- Victims: 3
- Span of crimes: December 15, 2003 – May 31, 2004
- Country: United States
- State: Florida
- Date apprehended: June 23, 2004

Eugene Wayman McWatters Jr. (June 20, 1978 – September 9, 2024), known as The Salerno Strangler, was an American serial killer and sex offender who attacked several homeless women in Port Salerno, Florida, from 2003 to 2004, strangling three of them to death. He was found guilty and initially sentenced to death in 2006, but eight years later his sentence was commuted to life on a technicality.

== Early life ==
McWatters was born on June 28, 1978. Not much is known about his childhood, but after dropping out of high school due to a drug habit, he struggled to find a job and engaged in low skilled labor for work. In January 1998, McWatters was arrested on charges of aggravated battery on a teenage boy. He pleaded no contest to the crime, for which he was convicted and served seven months in prison before being released on probation. McWatters was arrested once again in 2001, after injuring his girlfriend's father with a gun, but he only served three months for violating his probation.

In February of the following year, he was arrested for assaulting his landlord's son, but the charge was dropped after a lack of evidence was put forward. In November, he was again apprehended by authorities for robbing a man and stealing his necklace, but after the alleged victim refused to cooperate and later left the country, the charge was dropped. Nine months later in August 2003, McWatters was again arrested after he was caught robbing a woman's car, but he was later released after the victim did not cooperate with police.

== Murders ==
On December 15, 2003, McWatters raped a homeless woman at a campsite in Golden Gate. The victim did not report the attack to police. On March 24, 2004, McWatters raped another woman, 43-year-old Jackie Bradley. During the attack, McWatters choked and strangled Bradley to death. He took her body and dumped in a ditch filled with shallow water, where he attempted to bury it underneath a pile of rocks. On March 31, a jogger discovered the body. During the subsequent investigation, McWatters became someone of interest, as he was identified as the man last seen with her, but police didn't seek to question him. On May 31, McWatters picked up 29-year-old Christal Wiggins, a prostitute. He subsequently strangled her to death, and later dumped her body in a pile of brush. Hours later, McWatters struck again, this time the victim was 18-year-old Carrie Ann Caughey, who McWatters proceeded to strangle and cover up her body with a pile of branches, but accidentally tripped and broke his foot. Four days later, Caughey's body was discovered by a group of passersby.

By the time Caughey's body was found, she was assumed to have been killed by the same person who murdered Bradley. On June 7, the body of Wiggins was discovered, and she too was connected to the string of murders. During the investigation, detectives found out that McWatters was treated at a hospital after breaking his foot. By this time, the woman who was raped by McWatters in 2003 came forward, and she subsequently identified him in a photo-line up, and he was arrested the next day, and he confessed to all the murders, but later recanted.

== Trials and imprisonment ==
The trial began in September 2006. Prosecutors claimed that McWatters was a calculating killer, who lured in his victims with promises of drugs and alcohol, and that he remembered everything. McWatters’ attorneys claimed that McWatters only confessed because he enjoyed attention, but that he didn't kill any of the victims. Ultimately he was found guilty and sentenced to death on December 4, 2006. For the next eight years, McWatters remained on Florida's death row awaiting execution. In 2014, a judge awarded McWatters a new trial, on the grounds that his original defense team did a poor job. In the new trial, McWatters pleaded no contest, and was sentenced to life imprisonment in 2015. He died in prison in 2024.

== See also ==
- List of serial killers in the United States
