= Murray C. Wells =

American historian

Murray Charles Wells AO (born 1936) is a New Zealand economist, top manager, and Emeritus Professor of Accounting at the University of Sydney, known for his work on the history of accountancy.

== Life and work ==
Born in Christchurch, New Zealand, Wells attended Christ's College, Christchurch, and obtained his Master of Commerce at the University of Canterbury, and his Ph.D. at the University of Sydney. He also obtained his licence as Certified Public Accountant.

Wells started his academic career at the University of Canterbury in 1966. In 1975 Wells was appointed Professor in Accounting at the University of Sydney. From 1988 to 1999 he acted also as Dean of the Faculty of Economics & Business, and from 1988 to 1997 he directed The University of Sydney Graduate School of Business. In 1996 he became emeritus professor, and has been on directed several organization ever since.

Wells' research interests were in the fields of Accounting History, Financial and Cost Accounting Theory, and Corporate Governance.

In 2008 Wells and a colleague Paul Murnane created the Australian scholarship foundation which has awarded over 2000 scholarships to the directors and staff of Australian charities.

Wells was appointed an Officer of the Order of Australia (AO) in the 2019 Queen's Birthday Honours for "distinguished service to higher education, particularly to accountancy, and to business administration".

== Selected publications ==
- Wells, M.C. Accounting for Common Costs. Urbana: University of Illinois, 1978.
- Wells, Murray C. A Bibliography of Cost Accounting: Its Origins and Development to 1914. Center for International Education and Research in Accounting [University of Illinois], 1978.

Articles, a selection:

- Wells, Murray C. "Axioms for historical cost valuation." Journal of Accounting Research (1971): 171–180.
- Wells, Murray C. "A revolution in accounting thought?." Accounting Review (1976): 471–482.
- Wells, Murray C. "Some influences on the development of cost accounting." The Accounting Historians Journal (1977): 47–61.
- Bromwich, Michael, and Murray C. Wells. "The usefulness of a measure of wealth." Abacus 19.2 (1983): 119–129.
- Gormly, Claudia, and Murray Wells. "Costing activities: alternative views of history." Contributions in Economics and Economic History (1995): 45–56.
- Wells, Murray C. "Accounting Education in Australia." International Handbook of Accounting Education and Certification: Published in Association with the International Association for Accounting Education and Research (2014): 143.
