= Journal of Accounting and Public Policy =

- Discipline: Accounting, public policy
- Language: English
- Edited by: Marco Trombetta

Publication details
- History: 1982-present
- Publisher: Elsevier
- Frequency: Bimonthly
- Open access: Hybrid
- Impact factor: 1.796 (2017)

Standard abbreviations
- ISO 4: J. Account. Public Policy

Indexing
- CODEN: JACPDN
- ISSN: 0278-4254
- LCCN: 83642516
- OCLC no.: 7828244

Links
- Journal homepage; Online archive

The Journal of Accounting and Public Policy is a bimonthly peer-reviewed academic journal covering the interaction between accounting and public policy. It was established in 1982 by Elsevier, who continue to publish it today. The editor-in-chief is Marco Trombetta (IE Business School).

The journal regularly publishes special issues on a focussed topic and sponsors an annual academic conference, which rotates among the IE Business School, the London School of Economics, and the Robert H. Smith School of Business.

== Abstracting and indexing ==
The journal is abstracted and indexed in:

- ABI/Inform
- Current Contents/Social & Behavioral Sciences
- RePEc
- Social Sciences Citation Index
- Scopus

According to the Journal Citation Reports, the journal has a 2017 impact factor of 1.796.
