= Review of Accounting Studies =

Academic journal

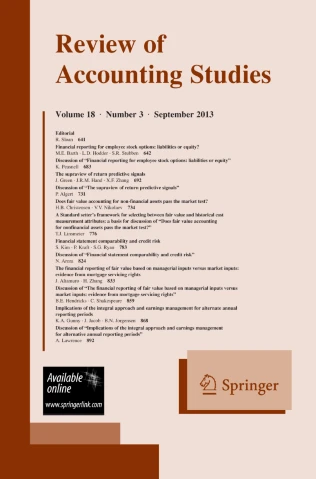
Cover of the Review of Accounting Studies

The Review of Accounting Studies (RAST) is a quarterly peer-reviewed academic journal covering topics in the field of accounting that includes theoretical, empirical, and experimental research. RAST prioritizes processing submitted manuscripts and aims to provide authors with accept-reject decisions early in the review process. As a result, most accepted manuscripts receive a decision following the initial submission or first revision. RAST was established in 1994 by a group founding editors including Gerald Feltham, John S. Hughes, James Ohlson, Stefan Reichelstein, and Stephen Penman. It is published by Springer Science+Business Media.

According to the Journal Citation Reports, the journal has a 2011 impact factor of 2.022, ranking it 10th out of 86 journals in the category "Business, Finance".
