= University of Chicago Booth School of Business =

Business school of the University of Chicago

Coordinates: 41°47′21″N 87°35′44″W

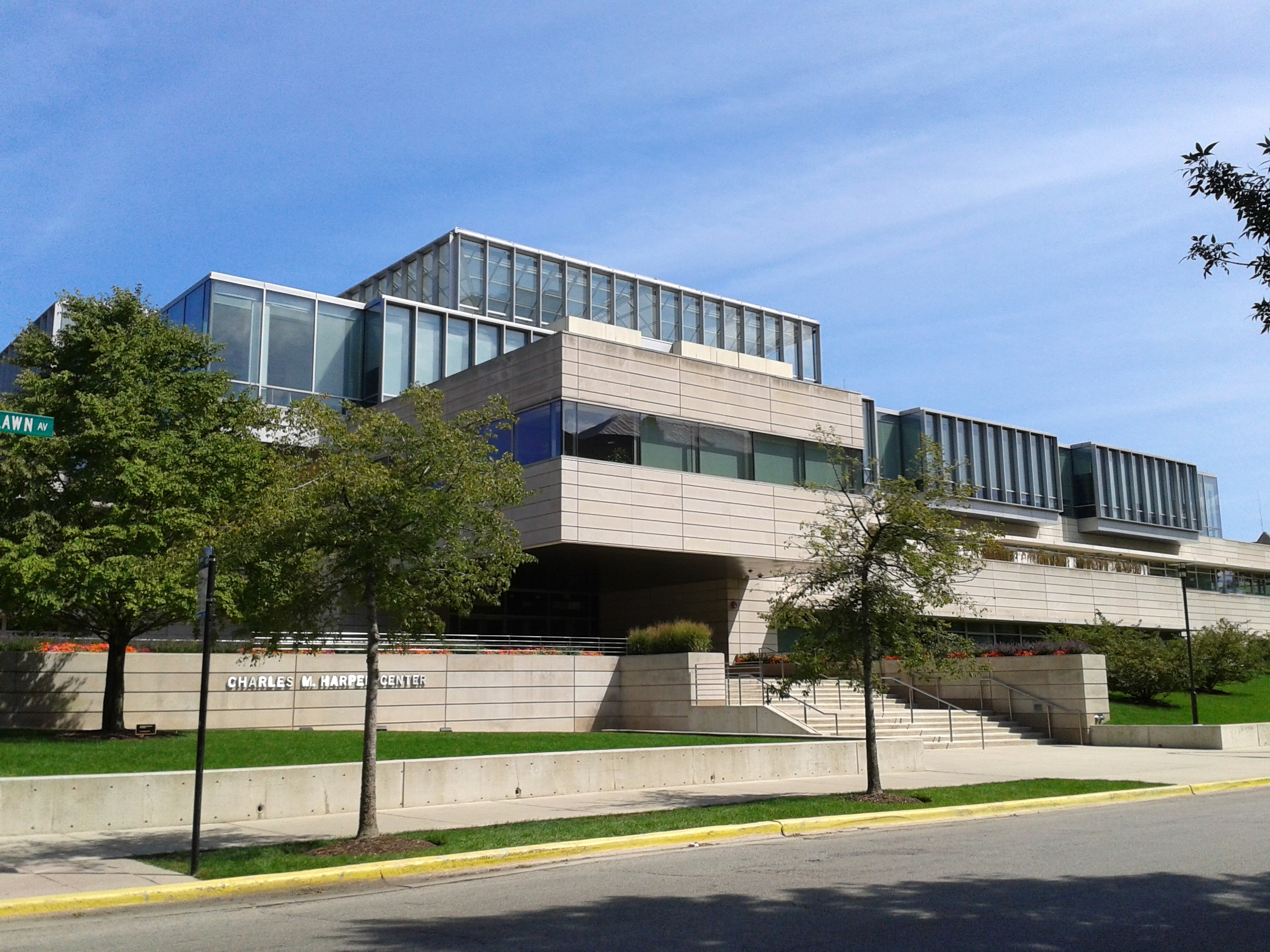
- Former names: College of Commerce and Politics (1898–1916); School of Commerce and Administration (1916–1932); School of Business (1932–1959; Graduate School of Business (1959–2008)
- Type: Private graduate business school
- Established: 1898
- Parent institution: University of Chicago
- Accreditation: AACSB
- Endowment: $1.034 billion
- Dean: Madhav V. Rajan
- Faculty: ca 200
- Postgraduates: 3,297
- Location: Chicago, Illinois, US
- Colors: Maroon and grey
- Website: chicagobooth.edu

The University of Chicago Booth School of Business (branded as Chicago Booth) is the graduate business school of the University of Chicago, a private research university in Chicago, Illinois, United States. Founded in 1898, Chicago Booth is the second-oldest business school in the U.S. and is associated with 10 Nobel laureates in the Economic Sciences, more than any other business school in the world.

Notable Chicago Booth alumni include James O. McKinsey, founder of McKinsey & Company; Peter G. Peterson, co-founder of Blackstone; Susan Wagner, co-founder of Blackrock; Eric Kriss, co-founder of Bain Capital; Roger Altman, co-founder of Evercore; Satya Nadella, current CEO of Microsoft; and other current and former CEOs of Fortune 500 companies such as Allstate Insurance, Booz Allen Hamilton, Cargill, Chevron, Chipotle Mexican Grill, Credit Suisse, Dominos, Goldman Sachs, IBM, Morgan Stanley, Morningstar, PIMCO, Reckitt Benckiser, and Starbucks.

== History ==
The University of Chicago Booth School of Business traces its roots to 1898 when university faculty member James Laurence Laughlin chartered the College of Commerce and Politics, which was intended to be an extension of the school's founding principles of "scientific guidance and investigation of great economic and social matters of everyday importance." The program originally served as a solely undergraduate institution until 1916, when academically oriented research masters and later doctoral-level degrees were introduced.

In 1916, the school was renamed the School of Commerce and Administration. Soon after in 1922, the first doctorate program was offered at the school. In 1932, the school was rechristened as the School of Business. The School of Business offered its first Master of Business Administration (MBA) in 1935. A landmark decision was taken by the school at about this time to concentrate its resources solely on graduate programs, and accordingly, the undergraduate program was phased out in 1942. In 1943, the school launched the first Executive MBA program. The school was renamed to the Graduate School of Business (or more popularly, the GSB) in 1959, a name that it held until 2008.

During the latter half of the twentieth century, the business school was instrumental in the development of the Chicago school of economics, an economic philosophy focused on free-market, minimal government involvement, due to faculty and student interaction with members of the university's influential Department of Economics. Other innovations by the school include initiating the first PhD program in business (1920), founding the first academic business journal (1928), offering the first Executive MBA (EMBA) program (1943), and for offering the first weekend MBA program (1986). Students at the school founded the National Black MBA Association (1972), and it is the only U.S. business school with permanent campuses on three continents: Asia (2000), Europe (1994), and North America (1898).

=== Renaming through donation ===
On November 6, 2008, alumnus David G. Booth (MBA 1971) gave the school a gift valued at US$300 million, and in honor of the gift, the Graduate School of Business was renamed the University of Chicago Booth School of Business.

On November 15, 2016, following a US$10 million gift from alumnus and university trustee Byron D. Trott (AB 1981; MBA 1982) and his wife, Tina, the school renamed its undergraduate UChicago Careers in Business Program the "Trott Business Program". Trott had also helped launch the undergraduate program in 2006.

On April 28, 2023, alumnus Ross Stevens (PhD 1996) donated US$100 million to support Chicago Booth's PhD program, which was renamed the "Stevens Doctoral Program".

On October 1, 2024, following a US$60 million gift from alumni Clifford Asness (MBA 1991; PhD 1994) and John Liew (AB 1989; MBA 1994; PhD 1995), the school renamed its Master in Finance degree program the "Asness and Liew Master in Finance Program".

On April 15, 2025, following a US$100 million gift by alumnus Konstantin Sokolov (MBA 2005), the school renamed its Executive MBA (EMBA) degree program the "Sokolov Executive MBA Program".

== Campuses ==
In Chicago, the Booth School has two campuses: the Charles M. Harper Center in Hyde Park, which houses the school's full-time MBA and Ph.D. programs, and the Gleacher Center in downtown Chicago, which hosts the part-time Evening and Weekend MBA Programs, Chicago-based Executive MBA Program, and Executive Education courses. Chicago Booth also has a campus in London, a short walk from St Paul's Cathedral, hosting the EMBA Program in Europe and Executive Education classes. Lastly, Chicago Booth has a campus in Hong Kong, located in the Hong Kong Jockey Club University of Chicago Academic Complex.

== Academics ==
Chicago Booth offers full-time, part-time (evening and weekend) and executive MBA programs. From the 2024–2025 academic year, Booth offers a Master in Finance and Master in Management degrees for recent college graduates who studied humanities, arts, social sciences, biological sciences, or physical sciences in college, and are interested in jobs that value business-oriented skills and knowledge.

The university also educates future academics, with graduate programs offering the A.M. and Ph.D. degrees in several fields. In addition to conducting graduate business programs, the school conducts research in the fields of finance, economics, quantitative marketing research, and accounting, among others. PhD graduates include Cliff Asness and John Liew, who co-founded money management firm AQR, and Ross Stevens, who founded Stone Ridge Asset Management.

=== Honors ===
Chicago Booth grants "High Honors" to the top five percent of the graduating class and "Honors" to its next 15 percent, based on GPA averages of all MBA graduates from the previous academic year. The recipients of the "High Honors" distinction have been known as the Amy and Richard F. Wallman Scholars at Chicago Booth since 2017, in recognition of a gift from Amy and Richard Wallman.

=== Research and learning centers ===
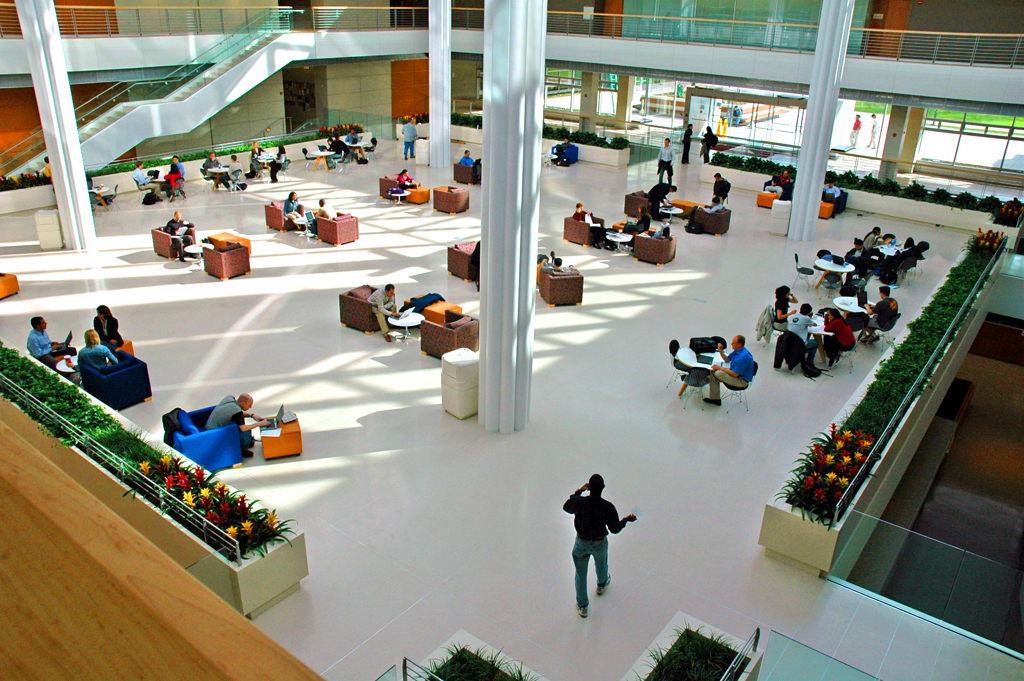
UChicago Booth School of Business interior

The school promotes and disseminates research through its centers and institutes; the most significant ones are:

- Accounting Research Center
- Applied Theory Initiative
- Center for Decision Research
- Center for Population Economics
- Chicago Energy Initiative
- Fama–Miller Center for Research in Finance
- George J. Stigler Center for the Study of the Economy and the State
- Initiative on Global Markets
- Michael P. Polsky Center for Entrepreneurship and Innovation
- The Becker Friedman Institute for Research in Economics
- James M. Kilts Center for Marketing
- Rustandy Center for Social Sector Innovation
- Tolan Center for Healthcare

== Rankings ==
Business school rankings

United States
- QS MBA: 5
- Financial Times MBA: 10
- Bloomberg MBA: 7
- USNWR MBA: 3
- THE Business: 5

Global
- QS MBA: 10
- Financial Times MBA: 20
- THE Business: 9

Chicago Booth was ranked #1 by both Forbes and The Economist in 2019. U.S. News & World Report ranks Chicago Booth in 2022 and 2023 as the #1 business school in the United States. U.S. News also ranked the school's executive MBA program #1 and its part-time program #1 in the U.S. In 2019, The Economist ranked the school's full-time MBA program as #1 globally. The Economist also ranked Chicago #1 each year from 2012 to 2016 and 2019. The Financial Times Rankings 2019 awarded Chicago Booth third place in Open Executive Education. Poets and Quants ranked the school #2 in their 2019 ranking.

== People ==
=== Deans ===
List of deans
Name	Tenure
Henry Rand Hatfield	1902–1904
Francis W. Shepardson	1904–1906
C.E. Merriam	1907–1909
Leon C. Marshall	1909–1924
William H. Spencer	1924–1945
Garfield V. Cox	1945–1952
John E. Jeuck	1952–1955
W. Allen Wallis	1956–1962
George P. Shultz	1962–1969
Sidney Davidson	1969–1974
Richard N. Rosett	1974–1982
John P. Gould	1983–1993
Robert S. Hamada	1993–2001
Edward A. "Ted" Snyder	2001–2010
Sunil Kumar	2011–2016
Douglas J. Skinner (interim)	2016–2017
Madhav V. Rajan	2017–present

=== Faculty ===
The Booth school has 177 professors, and includes Nobel laureates Eugene Fama, Richard Thaler, Lars Peter Hansen and Douglas Diamond; and MacArthur Fellow Kevin M. Murphy. Other notable economists at the school include Luigi Zingales and Raghuram Rajan, and former Chairperson of the Council of Economic Advisers, Austan Goolsbee, who is currently on leave as President of the Federal Reserve Bank of Chicago.

=== Alumni ===
The Chicago Booth Alumni has a community of over 49,000 members and is supported by 60+ alumni clubs worldwide. Alumni include Satya Nadella, Jon Corzine, Peter G. Peterson, Philip J. Purcell, Todd Young, Howard Marks, Megan McArdle, John Meriwether, Brian Niccol, and Susan Wagner.

== Publications ==
Chicago Booth currently publishes three academic journals:

- Journal of Accounting Research
- Journal of Law and Economics
- Journal of Political Economy (with the Department of Economics)

=== Chicago Booth Review ===
Chicago Booth Review is a magazine devoted to business research, particularly research conducted by Chicago Booth's own faculty. In addition to covering new findings in finance, behavioral science, economics, entrepreneurship, accounting, marketing, and other business-relevant subjects, the magazine features essays from Chicago Booth faculty and other academics. It is published quarterly in print and several times a week online.

Chicago Booth Review is the most recent of several successive vehicles Chicago Booth has used to convey its intellectual capital to an outside audience. Starting in the 1960s, the school published the Selected Papers series, a collection of articles written by faculty members or excerpted from faculty speeches. In 1997, Booth launched Capital Ideas (ISSN 1934-0060) as a separate newsletter featuring articles about faculty research. That subsequently evolved into a quarterly magazine, which in 2016 relaunched as Chicago Booth Review.

== See also ==
- Glossary of economics
- List of United States business school rankings
- List of business schools in the United States
