= Accounting Horizons =

- Discipline: Accounting
- Language: English
- Edited by: D. Scott Showalter, Bin Srinidhi

Publication details
- History: 1987–present
- Publisher: American Accounting Association (United States)
- Frequency: Quarterly
- Impact factor: 2.157 (2021)

Standard abbreviations
- ISO 4: Account. Horiz.

Indexing
- ISSN: 0888-7993 (print); 1558-7975 (web)
- LCCN: 88645569
- OCLC no.: 1313693227

Links
- Journal homepage

Accounting Horizons is a quarterly peer-reviewed academic journal published by the American Accounting Association. It was established in 1987.

The Association yearly presents the Accounting Horizons and Issues in Accounting Education Best Paper Awards.

== Abstracting and indexing ==
The journal is abstracted and indexed in:

- Current Contents/Social and Behavioral Sciences
- EBSCO databases
- International Bibliography of the Social Sciences
- ProQuest databases
- Scopus
- Social Sciences Citation Index

According to the Journal Citation Reports, the journal has a 2021 impact factor of 2.157.
