= Journal of Accounting and Economics =

- Discipline: Accounting, economics
- Language: English
- Edited by: J. Core, E. deHaan, and W.R. Guay

Publication details
- History: 1979-present
- Publisher: Elsevier
- Frequency: Bimonthly
- Impact factor: 7.239 (2021)

Standard abbreviations
- ISO 4: J. Account. Econ.

Indexing
- CODEN: JAECDS
- ISSN: 0165-4101
- LCCN: 2003204320
- OCLC no.: 04968789

Links
- Journal homepage; Online access

The Journal of Accounting and Economics is a peer-reviewed academic journal focusing on the fields of accounting and economics. The editors-in-chief are J. Core (Massachusetts Institute of Technology), E. deHaan (Stanford University), and W. R. Guay (University of Pennsylvania).

According to the Journal Citation Reports, the journal has a 2021 impact factor of 7.239.

== Reception ==
In a study by Kalaitzidakis et al. (2003), the Journal of Accounting and Economics ranked 88th out of 159 publications evaluated, but in an updated study by Kalaitzidakis et al. (2011) to 77th place out of 209 publications compared. In the economics publication ranking of the Tinbergen Institute at the University of Amsterdam, the Journal of Accounting and Economics is listed in category A (“very good general economics journals and top journals in the respective field”).

== See also ==
- Accounting research
