= Journal of Accounting Research =

Journal account

- Discipline: Accounting, auditing, taxation, economics, finance, business
- Language: English
- Edited by: Philip G. Berger, Luzi Hail, Christian Leuz, Valeri Nikolaev, Haresh Sapra, Laurence van Lent, and Regina Wittenberg Moerman

Publication details
- History: 1963-present
- Publisher: Wiley-Blackwell for the Chookaszian Accounting Research Center at the Booth School of Business
- Frequency: 5/year
- Impact factor: 4.9 (2023)

Standard abbreviations
- ISO 4: J. Account. Res.

Indexing
- ISSN: 0021-8456 (print); 1475-679X (web)
- JSTOR: jaccorese
- OCLC no.: 499769796

Links
- Journal homepage

The Journal of Accounting Research (JAR) is a leading peer-reviewed academic journal associated with the University of Chicago. It was established in 1963 and is published by Wiley-Blackwell on behalf of the Chookaszian Accounting Research Center (Formerly the Institute of Professional Accounting) at the University of Chicago Booth School of Business.

JAR publishes original research in all areas of accounting and topics including finance, economics, statistics, psychology, and sociology. Research typically uses analytical, empirical archival, experimental, or field study methods. Questions pertain to information and measurement used in organizations, markets, governments, regulation and standards; often arising in financial reporting, disclosure, internal accounting, auditing, taxation, corporate governance, capital markets, law, contracting, and with respect to the accounting profession.

Its current senior editors are Philip G. Berger, Luzi Hail, Christian Leuz, Valeri Nikolaev, Haresh Sapra, Laurence van Lent, and Regina Wittenberg Moerman. The editorial manager is Lisa M. Heiberger.

It is listed as one of the 50 journals used by the Financial Times to compile its business-school research ranks and Bloomberg Businessweek's Top 20 Journals. According to the Journal Citation Reports, it has a 2022 impact factor of 4.4, ranking it 28 out of 111 journals in the category "Business, Finance".

== Alleged research misconduct ==
Non-academically-employed and non-peer-review published "researcher" Stephen Walker critiqued a 2020 JAR article, which resulted in JAR publishing a 2022 "Erratum." Walker characterized the "Erratum" as a mischaracterization of the original research, alleged it contained a falsehood, and called for a misconduct investigation. The University of Melbourne's Ian D. Gow published the paper "Should Bao et al. (2020) be retracted?" in 2022, followed up by another paper where he called the "Erratum"'s explanation less than plausible, said it was belied by the original paper, and claimed it failed to account for the "claimed error." Overall, Gow argued that a "retract and republish" approach may have been superior to an "erratum" approach in order to most clearly correct the record from the original paper. JAR performed an extensive investigation and shared its findings with Walker in a 2023 document created as a result of Walker's request for the misconduct investigation, but did not publish the document.

== Former Editors ==
- Sidney Davidson
- David O. Green
- Nicholas Dopuch
- Katherine Schipper
- Richard Leftwich
- Abbie J. Smith
- Ray Ball
- Merle Erickson
- Douglas J. Skinner
- Rodrigo Verdi
