= European Accounting Review =

Accounting journal

The European Accounting Review is the peer-refereed journal of the European Accounting Association, published by Taylor & Francis.

The European Accounting Review is an international scholarly journal of the European Accounting Association (EAA). European Accounting Review is global in scope and welcomes submissions relating to any country or region as long as their relevance to an international audience is clearly communicated.

The European Accounting Review was established in 1992. The journal initially published three issues per year, which was increased to four issues per year as of 1995. It is the only academic journal to provide a European forum for accounting research. The editor is Beatriz Garcia Osma, of Universidad Carlos III de Madrid, Spain.

== Past Editors ==
2016-2019: Hervé Stolowy

2012-2015: Laurence van Lent

2006-2011: Salvador Carmona

2000-2005: Kari Lukka

1997-2000: Anne Loft, Peter Walton

1992-1997: Ann Jorissen, Anne Loft & Peter Walton

== Abstracting and indexing ==
The journal is abstracted and indexed in:

- ABI/Inform
- Current Contents/Social & Behavioral Sciences
- RePEc
- Social Sciences Citation Index
- Scopus
- Scimago.

According to the Journal Citation Reports, the journal has a 2018 impact factor of 2.322.
