= Dean Neu =

Canadian accounting academic

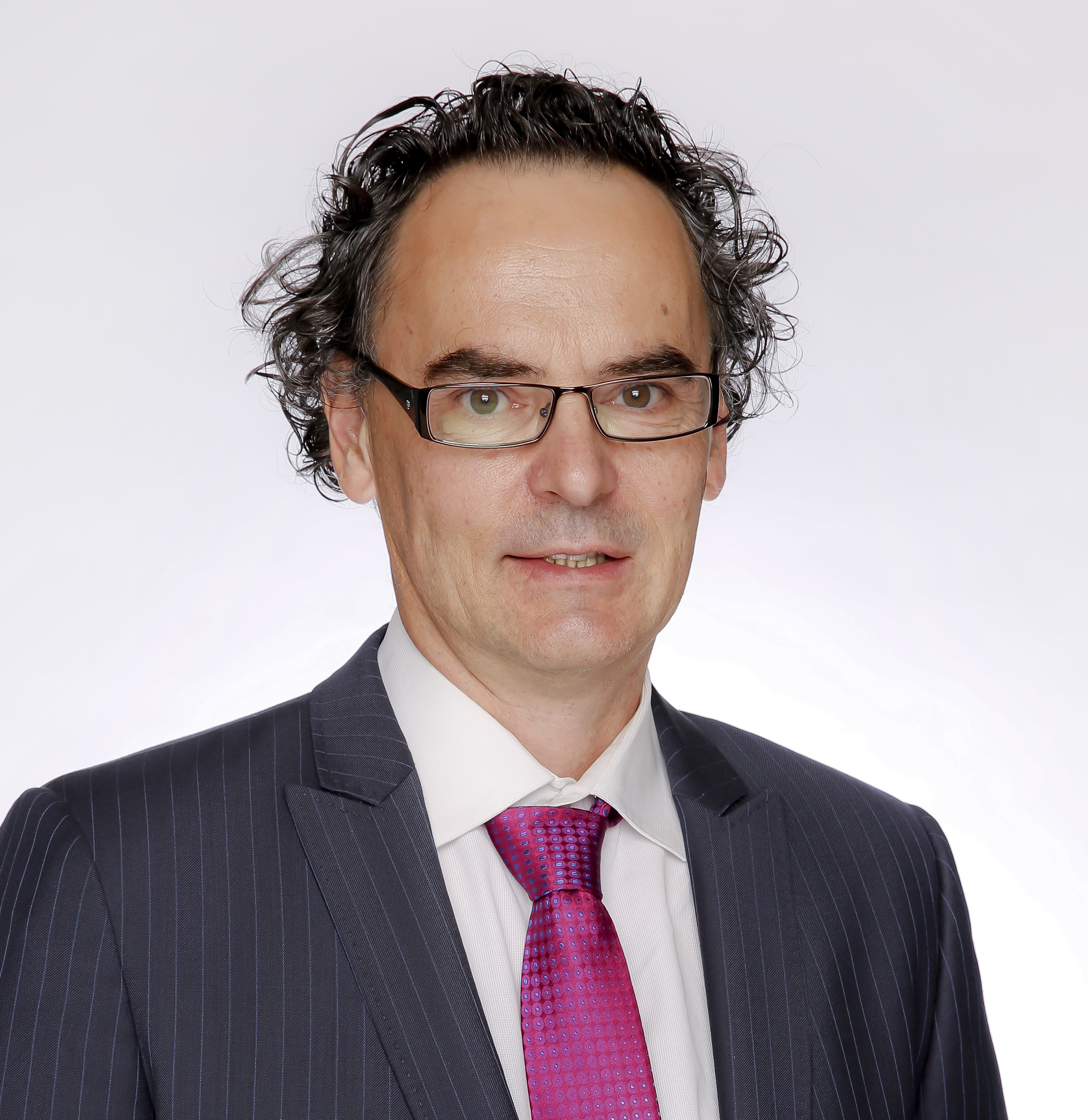
- Born: Canada
- Education: Queen's University (PhD)
- Known for: Critical accounting research
- Awards: Canadian Academic Accounting Association Award for Distinguished Contribution to Accounting Thought
- Scientific career
- Fields: Accounting
- Workplaces: University of Calgary (1989–2008); York University (2008-present)

Dean Neu is a professor of accounting at York University, Canada. He is a former editor of Critical Perspectives on Accounting, a former board member of the Parkland Institute and the Director of the Public Interest Accounting Group at York University.

== Intellectual contributions ==
He is best known for his studies of accounting power in action: that is how governments, international organizations and corporations use accounting to govern and subjugate less powerful members of society, and how the less powerful respond and resist. This genre of accounting research—what is often referred to as critical accounting research or public interest accounting research—tends to use the case study method to examine how accounting is used in certain settings as well as the associated consequences. The starting point is the recognition that accounting numbers both help make certain aspects of organizational reality visible and distributes economic resources. This research differs from other accounting research such as positive accounting which assumes that research is descriptive rather than normative. Neu's publications include:

- Neu, Dean; Therrien, Richard (2003). By the numbers: accounting for the cultural genocide of Canada's aboriginal peoples. Canada: Fernwood.
- Ocampo, Elizabeth; Neu, Dean (2008). Doing missionary work: The World Bank and the diffusion of financial practices. Canada: Fernwood.
- Neu, Dean; Rahaman, Abu; Everett, Jeffery (2014). "Accounting and sweatshops: enabling coordination and control in low-price apparel production chains". Contemporary Accounting Research. 31 (12): 322–346. doi:10.1111/1911-3846.12026.

Along with other publicly-interested accounting academics such as David J. Cooper, Abraham J. Briloff, Christine Cooper and Prem Sikka, he has practiced public interest accounting through both his research and through his participation in the public sphere. These public interventions include speaking out against concrete forms of neo-liberalism such as government privatization and deficit-cutting activities that disproportionately affect the most vulnerable members of society.

== Intellectual lineage ==
Neu, along with David J. Cooper and Yves Gendron, has trained a number of public interest accounting academics in Canada. His former students include Jeffery Everett, Cameron Graham, Susan Greer, Elizabeth Ocampo, Darlene Himick, Gregory Saxton, and Kate Ruff.
