= Public interest accounting =

Branch of accounting research

Public interest accounting is a branch of academic accounting research that attempts to understand how accounting practices and the activities of the accounting profession impact the public interest. Public interest-focused accounting research sheds light on the role of accounting in perpetuating unequal social relations, while attempting to rectify such issues via scholarship and the dissemination of research results. It is heavily influenced by the ideas of social theorists, including but not limited to Marx, Gramsci, Foucault, Bourdieu, and Said.

== History ==
Public interest accounting emerged as a legitimate research domain during the 1970s and can be traced back to practitioner-academics such as Abe Briloff in the United States and a group of accounting academics in the United Kingdom, including Tony Lowe, Tony Puxty, David Cooper, Trevor Hopper and Tony Tinker. For example, Tinker's book, Paper Prophets, developed a political economy approach to accounting, while the book by Cooper and Hopper, Debating Coal Closures, discussed how accounting functions as an ammunition machine within the public sphere. These books, as well as a series of academic articles around the same time, illustrated the public interest consequences of accounting practice and provided the impetus for subsequent research on public interest accounting topics.

== The role of the accountancy profession ==
The role of the public accountancy profession in working for or against the public interest is a key theme in public interest accounting. Abe Briloff's article, "Accountancy and Society: A Covenant Desecrated," argues that public accounting firms have a social contract granting them monopoly privileges in return for protecting public interest. Unfortunately, says Briloff, the profession does not always live up to its societal obligations. Subsequent articles examine whether public accountancy protects the public interest. For instance, a series of high profile articles by Prem Sikka, Hugh Willmott, and colleagues examines moments when public accounting firms have been involved in money laundering and other ethically dubious endeavors. This stream of research does not deny that accounting is a necessary coordination and stewardship device; rather, it draws attention to how the practices of public accounting firms often benefit their rich clients (rather than society at large).

== Accounting consequences ==
The second stream of research uses a series of detailed case studies to consider how accounting practices divide society, marginalize specific groups, and sustain that marginalization. For instance, studies in this genre have examined the impact of certain accounting practices on indigenous people, including indigenous children. Other studies have analyzed class-based and gender-based consequences. Other studies have examined the impact on the elderly. Taken together, these studies show that accounting is not simply a neutral technique that maps an objective economic reality, but rather participates in creating social and economic reality, often in partisan ways.

== Accounting interventions ==
The recognition that accounting is partisan has encouraged some public interest accounting researchers to adopt the position of a "specific intellectual" (that is, an engaged intellectual, as opposed to the traditional notion of the disengaged "universal intellectual") and to use their academic expertise to intervene directly in public policy debates. This theoretical vantage point follows from the writings of Gramsci, Foucault, and Said, and draws on the notion of "speaking truth" to the existing regime of power. Studies in this genre have analyzed and intervened in government privatization initiatives, neo-liberal corporate tax reductions, tax avoidance and changes to health and safety, among other topics. Prominent public-interest accounting interveners include Briloff, David Cooper, Christine Cooper, Neu, and Sikka.

== Publicly-interested academic accounting journals ==
Public interest accounting research has been published in Accounting, Organizations and Society, Critical Perspectives on Accounting, Accounting, Auditing & Accountability Journal, Accounting Forum, Advances in Public Interest Accounting and the Journal of Business Ethics. The American Accounting Association has a specialized journal entitled Accounting and the Public Interest devoted to the public interest consequences of accounting practices.

== See also ==
- Public opinion
