= Joni J. Young =

American accounting academic

- Scientific career
- Fields: Accounting
- Workplaces: University of Illinois; University of New Mexico

Joni J Young is an American accounting academic.

== History ==
Joni J. Young is a Professor of Accountancy at the Anderson School of Management, of the University of New Mexico. She has also been a visiting professor at the London School of Economics. She qualified as a Certified Public Accountant in 1981, winning the Elijah Watt Sells award of distinction for CPA exam results. Since becoming an academic, Young has twice won (in 2008 and 2012) the Outstanding Educator Award from the New Mexico Society of Certified Public Accountants. In 2011, she won the award for Notable Contributions to the Accounting Literature from the American Accounting Association. She is an Associate Editor of Critical Perspectives on Accounting, and is also a member of the Editorial Advisory Board of the Accounting, Auditing & Accountability Journal.

Much of Dr. Young’s work has been focused on her interests in institutional financial reporting and accountability.

== Selected publications ==
- 2010 Misplaced Trust: The American Indian Trust Fund Debacle (with Leslie Oakes), Critical Perspectives on Accounting, v. 21, 63-75.
- 2008 Accountability Re-examined: Evidence from Hull House (with L. Oakees), Accounting, Auditing & Accountability Journal, 21 (6), 765-790.
- 2006 Examining Audit Relations. Advances in Public Interest Accounting, v. 12, 49-65.
- 2006 Making Up Users. Accounting, Organizations and Society, v. 31, n. 6, 579-600.
- 2005 Changing the Questions. Accounting and the Public Interest, v. 5.
- 2000 Organizing and Regulating as Rhizomatic Lines: Bank Fraud and Auditing (with Phil Bougen), Organization (2000) pp. 403–426.
- 1999 Accountants and the Everyday: Or What the Papers Said About the Irish Accountant and Tax Evasion (with Phil Bougen and Edward Cahill), European Accounting Review, pp. 443–461.
- 1997 Defining Auditor's Responsibilities, Accounting Historians Journal, pp. 25–63.
- 1996 Objectivity and the Role of History in the Development and Review of Accounting Standards (with Tom Mouck). Accounting, Auditing & Accountability Journal pp. 127–147.
- 1989 On the Logical Foundations for Self Regulation: Rules, Corporations and Financial Accounting (with Orace Johnson). Research in Accounting Regulation, pp. 131–151.
