= Cheryl Lehman =

Cheryl Lehman, also professionally known as Cheryl R. Lehman, is a professor at Hofstra University and an accounting academic.

== History ==
Cheryl Lehman graduated with a bachelor's degree in accounting in 1975 from Queen's College of The City University of New York. She obtained a Master of Philosophy degree from New York University in 1982, from which she also obtained a doctorate in accounting in 1985, from the Graduate School of Business Administration.

Lehman is the founding editor of the book series Advances in Public Interest Accounting. She is also a member of the Board of Editors of Critical Perspectives on Accounting, and a member of the Editorial Advisory Board of the Accounting, Auditing & Accountability Journal. She is also a member of the Board of Editors of Gender, Work and Organization.

Lehman is the author of Accounting's Changing Role in Social Conflict (Markus Weiner, 1992) which has been translated into Japanese and Korean. Her articles have been published in such journals as Accounting, Organizations and Society, Critical Perspectives on Accounting. and the Accounting, Auditing & Accountability Journal, among others.
