= Jane Andrew =

Australian accounting academic

- Education: University of Wollongong
- Known for: Environmental accounting research; Privatization research
- Scientific career
- Fields: Accounting
- Institutions: University of Wollongong (2000-2010); University of Sydney Business School (2010-present)

Jane Andrew is an Australian academic who is an associate professor of accounting at the University of Sydney Business School and co-editor-in-chief of Critical Perspectives on Accounting. Andrew's research focuses on environmental accounting and on accountability in public policy. Andrew has also been a prominent critic of prison privatization in Australia.

== Life and career ==
Andrew obtained her PhD in accounting from the University of Wollongong in 2000. Her dissertation examined the development of environmental accounting and accountability in public policy. After completing her doctoral studies, she joined the faculty of the University of Wollongong. In 2010, she moved to the University of Sydney. In 2018, she was appointed co-editor-in-chief of Critical Perspectives on Accounting.

== Research ==
Andrew's research uses social theory to examine international mechanisms for environmental accountability, particularly the Kyoto Protocol and emerging practices, regulation and policy related to carbon accounting.

She also studies government accountability in relation to privatization. In 2009, she co-authored In Government We Trust: Market Failure and the Delusions of Privatisation, which led to an invitation to participate in the 2009 New South Wales Parliamentary Inquiry into Prison Privatisation. In 2016, she co-authored a report entitled "Prison Privatisation in Australia: The State of the Nation," examining the costs, performance and accountability of Australian private prisons.

== Editorial work ==
In addition to serving as co-editor-in-chief of Critical Perspectives on Accounting, Andrew is associate editor of Abacus and sits on the editorial boards of :

- Accounting, Auditing & Accountability Journal
- Advances in Public Interest Accounting
- Australasian Accounting, Business and Finance Journal

== Selected publications ==
The following articles have each been cited over 100 times, according to Google Scholar:

- Hossain, M., Islam, K., and Andrew, J. (2006). Corporate Social and Environmental Disclosure in Developing Countries: Evidence from Bangladesh. University of Wollongong, Research Online.
- Andrew, J., and Cortese, C. (2011). Accounting for climate change and the self-regulation of carbon disclosures. Accounting Forum, 35(3), 130-138.
