= Marcia Annisette =

Trinidadian-Canadian accounting academic

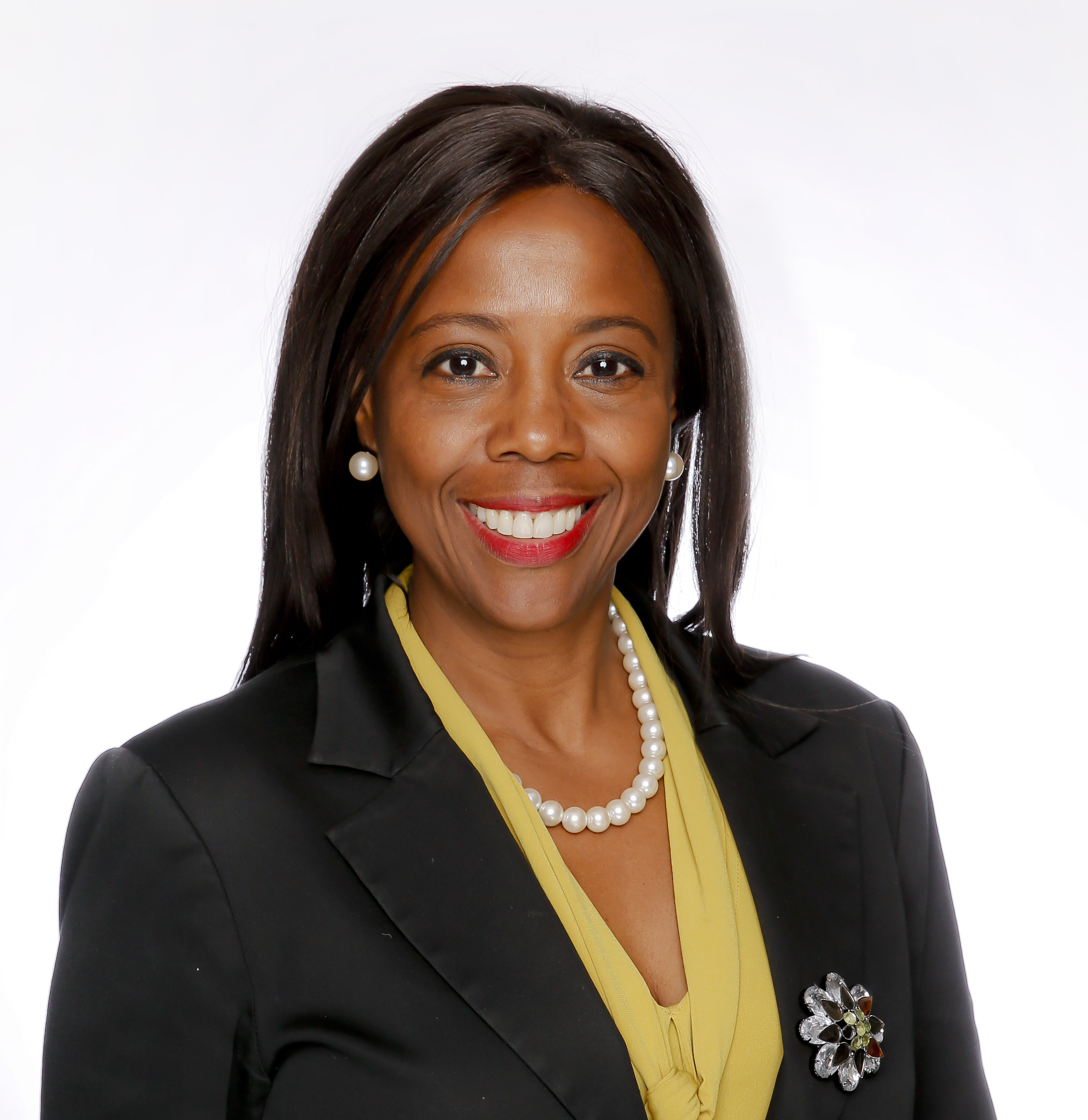
- Marcia Annisette in 2015
- Born: Trinidad and Tobago
- Education: University of Manchester (PhD)
- Known for: Critical accounting research
- Scientific career
- Fields: Accounting
- Institutions: University of Manchester (1996-1997); University of West Indies (1998-1999); Universidad Carlos III de Madrid (1999-2002); Howard University Business School (2002-2005); Schulich School of Business, York University (2005-present)

Marcia Annisette is a Trinidadian-Canadian accounting academic, and currently the Vice Provost Academic at York University in Toronto. She is co-editor-in-chief of Accounting, Organizations and Society. She has previously held positions as the Associate Dean Students and the Associate Dean Academic at the Schulich School of Business. She is a former co-editor-in-chief of Critical Perspectives on Accounting. Her research looks at the social organization of the accounting profession, addressing issues of race, class, and nationality.

== Life and career ==
Annisette was born in Trinidad and Tobago. She studied industrial management at the University of the West Indies and then moved to the United Kingdom to study accounting at the University of Manchester Institute of Science and Technology, graduating in 1993 with a Master of Science in accounting and finance. She pursued her doctoral education at the University of Manchester, graduating with her PhD in accounting in 1996. Her dissertation examined imperialism in the accounting profession.

After holding positions at the University of the West Indies, Universidad Carlos III de Madrid, and Howard University Business School, she became an associate professor at the Schulich School of Business in Toronto in 2005.She was promoted to Full Professor in 2019

In 2009, Annisette was appointed co-editor-in-chief of Critical Perspectives on Accounting. In 2018, she relinquished that position to become co-editor-in-chief of Accounting, Organizations and Society.

Annisette is an editorial board member for several journals in her field, including Accounting, Auditing & Accountability Journal, Journal of Accounting & Organizational Change, Journal of Accounting in Emerging Economies, Research in Accounting in Emerging Economies, and Qualitative Research in Accounting & Management.

In 2023, Annisette was awarded the title of University Professor by York University.

== Research ==
Annisette's research interests centre on the social organization of the accounting profession, specifically "the manner in which national bases of social exclusion such as religion, social class, race, nationality or immigration status, interact with professional structures to achieve professional closure."

Annisette's most cited paper examines the relationship between imperialism and the establishment of the accounting profession in Trinidad and Tobago. The paper shows how the interests of the UK accounting profession and of local elite members of the Trinidadian accounting profession came together to ensure the dominance of the British-based Association of Chartered Certified Accountants (ACCA) in accounting education and certification in Trinidad and Tobago, contrary to the interests of those who wished to develop a more independent national accountancy training program.

Her later research has explored issues of race in the accounting profession and the influence of globalization and transnational institutions on the profession.

== Selected publications ==
The following articles have each been cited over 100 times, according to Google Scholar:

- Annisette, M. (2000). Imperialism and the professions: The education and certification of accountants in Trinidad and Tobago. Accounting Organizations and Society, 25(7), pp. 631–659.
- Annisette, M. (2003). The colour of accountancy: examining the salience of race in a professionalisation project. Accounting, Organizations and Society, 28(7-8), 639–674.
- Annisette, M. (2004). The true nature of the World Bank. Critical Perspectives on Accounting, 15(3), 303–323.
- Annisette, M. (1999). Importing accounting: the case of Trinidad and Tobago. Accounting, Business & Financial History, 9(1), 103–133.

== Professional designations ==
- FCCA (Fellow, Association of Chartered Certified Accountants, United Kingdom)
- CPA, CGA (Chartered Professional Accountants of Canada)

== Awards ==
- 2017 Mary Parker Follett Award, Highly Commended, for "Immigration and Neo-Liberalism: Three Cases and Counter Accounts" (with Cheryl Lehman and Gloria Ageymang), Accounting Auditing and Accountability Journal, Vol. 29(1), pp. 43–79.
- 2012 Mary Parker Follett Award, Highly Commended, for "Justification and Accounting: Applying Sociology of Worth to Accounting Research" (with Alan J Richardson), Accounting Auditing and Accountability Journal, Vol. 24(2), pp. 229–249.
- 2008 Emerald Literati Network Awards for Excellence, Outstanding Paper Award, for “Joined for the common purpose: the establishment of the Institute of Chartered Accountants in Ireland as an All-Ireland Institution” (with Philip O’ Regan), Qualitative Research in Accounting and Management, Vol. 4(1) pp. 4–25
- 1999 Basil Yamey Prize for Best Article, for “Importing Accounting: the case of Trinidad and Tobago”, Accounting Business and Financial History Vol. 9 (1), pp. 103–133.
