= Earnings surprise =

An earnings surprise, or unexpected earnings, in accounting, is the difference between the reported earnings and the expected earnings of an entity. Measures of a firm's expected earnings, in turn, include analysts' forecasts of the firm's profit and mathematical models of expected earnings based on the earnings of previous accounting periods.

== Effect of earnings surprises ==
Stock markets tend to react in the same direction as earnings surprises—positively to positive earnings surprises and negatively to negative earnings surprises—although a significant proportion of earnings surprises result in stock markets reacting in the opposite direction, which may be a reaction to other relevant information released with the earnings announcement or inaccurate measurement of the earnings surprise.

The market, however, may not correctly estimate the implications of earnings surprises when it revises its expectations of future earnings, which will decrease the change in stock prices associated with the change in earnings. In fact, many studies in accounting research have documented that the market takes up to a year to adjust to earnings announcements, a phenomenon known as the post-earnings announcement drift.

Large negative earnings surprises may have legal and reputational costs to managers. Firstly, managers can be held personally liable if shareholders sue the firm for failing to disclose negative earnings news promptly. Secondly, money managers may choose not to hold, and analysts may choose not to follow, the stocks of firms whose managers have reputations for withholding bad news. This may contribute to managers' voluntary disclosure of information related to negative earnings surprises: quarterly earnings announcements containing large negative earnings surprises are preempted by voluntary disclosures more frequently than are other earnings announcements.

== Measurement ==
Earnings surprises can be measured using historical earnings or analysts' forecasts.

In accounting research, a measure that uses historical earnings is standardized unexpected earnings (SUE). SUE is the standardized difference between reported earnings and expected earnings, where expected earnings is modelled based on the assumption that earnings follows a seasonal random walk with a specific trend. In other words, in the case of quarterly earnings the SUE for quarter t is

$$SUE_t = \frac{Q_t - E(Q_t)}{\sigma(Q_t - E(Q_t))}$$

where σ(X) is the standard deviation of X, and the expected earnings, E(Q_{t}), is calculated using prior reported earnings:

$$E(Q_t) = \delta + Q_{t-4}$$

where Q_{t-4} is the reported earnings for quarter t-4 and δ is the average trend.

An alternative measure of SUE that uses analysts' forecasts is

$$SUE = \frac{EPS - Forecast}{\sigma(EPS - Forecast)}$$

where EPS is a firm's earnings per share, and Forecast is analysts' consensus forecast of its earnings per share.

== See also ==
- Profit warning
