= David J. Cooper =

Canadian accounting academic

- Born: London, England
- Education: University of Manchester (PhD)
- Known for: Critical accounting research
- Scientific career
- Fields: Accounting
- Workplaces: University of East Anglia (1981-1984); University of Manchester Institute of Science and Technology (1984-1989); University of Alberta (1989-2018)

David J. Cooper is a Emeritus Professor of Accounting at the University of Alberta, Canada. He is the co-founder, along with Anthony Tinker, of the academic journal Critical Perspectives on Accounting, with whom he served until 2008. He was also a long-time associate editor of Accounting, Organizations and Society. He is best known as a central figure and co-founder of the critical accounting, interdisciplinary accounting, and public interest accounting movements, which emphasize the importance of studying the roles of accounting in organizations and society, applying critical theory to study the impact of accounting and accounting institutions on society, and using this knowledge to intervene in the public sphere.

== Life and career ==
Cooper was born in London, England in 1949. He completed his undergraduate studies at the London School of Economics in 1970 and his PhD at the University of Manchester in 1980. He held appointments at Manchester University, University of East Anglia, and University of Manchester Institute of Science and Technology (where he was Price Waterhouse Professor and Head of the School of Management). While at UMIST he led a multinational study on accounting regulation, was involved in a major study of management control in the National Coal Board, providing an influential critique of management and government claims during the miners’ strike. In 1985 he and Trevor Hopper, created the Interdisciplinary Perspectives on Accounting conference, which continues to the present.

In 1989, he moved from the United Kingdom to Canada, accepting a research chair at the University of Alberta. He led the PhD program at the School of Business (1989-2012) and was the faculty union representative on the University's Board of Governors (2015-2018). He has held visiting positions at many universities, including the University of British Colombia, Oxford University, the London School of Economics, Copenhagen Business School, Uppsala Univesrity, Kyoto University, University of Paris Dauphine, University of Sydney, and the University of Edinburgh.

== Intellectual contributions ==
Cooper has pushed our understanding of three aspects of accounting practice. First, his research on the political economy of accounting during the 1980s, helped to incite a vibrant research tradition on the role of accounting numbers in social struggle. Political economy of accounting approaches acknowledge that accounting numbers both selectively re-present social reality and act as a distributional mechanism for allocating societal resources. These insights have been taken up and used to study a variety of public interest accounting topics such as environmental reporting as well as class and gender-based aspects of financial reporting.

Second, Cooper’s research on the accounting profession has illuminated the intersections among public accounting firm practices, the organization of the accounting profession, and the associated societal-level consequences. This stream of research draws upon the sociology of the professions literature, extending this literature to show how the accounting profession is similar yet different from other professions such as medicine and law. The research also traces how globalization has impacted on the organization and activities of public accounting.

Third, Cooper has theorized and practiced the role of the specific, public intellectual. Building on the insights of Foucault, Burawoy, and Bourdieu, Cooper showed the importance of using accounting expertise to intervene in the public sphere. The interventions included the United Kingdom Coal Board interventions in the 1980s as well as the debt/deficit interventions and privatization interventions in Canada in the 1990s.

Cooper has served as a board member and resident accounting expert for the Parkland Institute, a Canadian-based public think-tank. In retirement, Cooper is active as a public intellectual, most notably concerning environmental liabiltities of oil and gas companies.

== Intellectual lineage ==
Cooper has supervised 21 PhD students and has acted as mentor to a group of prominent accounting academics. These include Keith Robson (editor-in-chief of Accounting, Organizations and Society), Vaughan Radcliffe (who has studied public secrets within governmental accounting), Dean Neu (another public interest accounting researcher), and Daniel Martinez (who studies NGO accountability). Cooper has been heavily involved in many courses and workshops for PhD and young researchers, most notably for the European Accounting Association, which awarded him its award for Academic Leadership in 2022.
