= Social accounting =

Process of communicating the social effects of organizations to the society at large

Social accounting (also known as social and environmental accounting, corporate social reporting, corporate social responsibility reporting, non-financial reporting or non-financial accounting) is the process of communicating the social and environmental effects of organizations' economic actions to particular interest groups within society and to society at large. Social Accounting differs from public interest accounting and critical accounting. This 21st-century definition contrasts with the 20th-century meaning of social accounting as accounting for the national income, gross product, and wealth of a nation or region.

Social accounting is commonly used in the context of business, or corporate social responsibility (CSR), although any organisation, including NGOs, charities, and government agencies, may engage in social accounting. Social Accounting can also be used alongside community-based monitoring (CBM).

Social accounting emphasises corporate accountability. D. Crowther defines social accounting in this sense as "an approach to reporting a firm's activities which stresses the need for the identification of socially relevant behaviour, the determination of those to whom the company is accountable for its social performance and the development of appropriate measures and reporting techniques". It is an important step in helping companies independently develop CSR programs which are shown to be much more effective than government-mandated CSR.

Social accounting is a broad field that can be divided into narrower fields. Environmental accounting may account for an organisation's impact on the natural environment. Sustainability accounting quantitatively analyses social and economic sustainability. National accounting uses economics as an analytical method. The International Standards Organization (ISO) provides a standard, ISO 26000, which is a resource for social accounting. It addresses the seven core areas that must be assessed for social responsibility accounting.

== Purpose ==
Social accounting challenges conventional accounting, in particular financial accounting, for giving a narrow image of the interaction between society and organizations, and thus artificially constraining the subject of accounting.

Social accounting, a largely normative concept, seeks to broaden the scope of accounting in the sense that it should:

- concern itself with more than only economic events;
- not be exclusively expressed in financial terms;
- be accountable to a broader group of stakeholders;
- broaden its purpose beyond reporting financial success.

It points to the fact that companies influence their external environment ( some times positively and many times negatively) through their actions and should, therefore, account for these effects as part of their standard accounting practices. Social accounting is in this sense closely related to the economic concept of externality. Social accounting offers an alternative account of significant economic entities. It has the "potential to expose the tension between pursuing economic profit and the pursuit of social and environmental objectives".

The purpose of social accounting can be approached from two different angles, namely for management control purposes or accountability purposes.

=== Accountability vs authority ===
Social accounting for accountability purposes is designed to support and facilitate the pursuit of society's objectives. These objectives can be manifold but can typically be described in terms of social and environmental desirability and sustainability. In order to make informed choices on these objectives, the flow of information in society in general, and in accounting in particular, needs to cater to democratic decision-making. In democratic systems, Gray argues, there must then be flows of information in which those controlling the resources provide accounts to society of their use of those resources: a system of corporate accountability.

Society is seen to profit from implementing a social and environmental approach to accounting in a number of ways, e.g.:

- Honoring stakeholders' rights of information;
- Balancing corporate power with corporate responsibility;
- Increasing transparency of corporate activity;
- Identifying social and environmental costs of economic success.

=== Management control ===
Social accounting for the purpose of management control is designed to support and facilitate the achievement of an organization's own objectives. Because social accounting is concerned with substantial self-reporting on a systemic level, individual reports are often referred to as social audits. The first complete internal model for social accounting and audit, 1981, was designed for social enterprises to help plan and measure their social, environmental and financial progress towards achieving their planned objectives.

Organizations are seen to benefit from implementing social accounting practices in a number of ways, e.g.:

- Increased information for decision-making;
- Enhanced image management and public relations;
- Identification of social responsibilities;
- Identification of market development opportunities;
- Maintaining legitimacy.

The management control view focuses on the individual organization. Critics of this approach point out that the benign nature of companies is assumed. Here, responsibility, and accountability, is largely left in the hands of the organization concerned.

== Scope ==
=== Formal accountability ===
In social accounting the focus tends to be on larger organisations such as multinational corporations (MNCs), and their visible, external accounts rather than informally produced accounts or accounts for internal use. The need for formality in making MNCs accountability is given by the spatial, financial and cultural distance of these organisations to those who are affecting and affected by it. Social accounting also questions the reduction of all meaningful information to financial form. Financial data is seen as only one element of the accounting language.

=== Self-reporting and third party audits ===
In most countries, existing legislation only regulates a fraction of accounting for socially relevant corporate activity. In consequence, most available social, environmental and sustainability reports are produced voluntarily by organisations and in that sense often resemble financial statements. While companies' efforts in this regard are usually commended, there seems to be a tension between voluntary reporting and accountability, for companies are likely to produce reports favouring their interests.

The re-arrangement of social and environmental data that companies already produce as part of their normal reporting practice into an independent social audit is called a silent or shadow account.

An alternative phenomenon is the creation of external social audits by groups or individuals independent of the accountable organisation and typically without its encouragement. External social audits thus also attempt to blur the boundaries between organisations and society and to establish social accounting as a fluid two-way communication process. Companies are sought to be held accountable regardless of their approval. It is in this sense that external audits part with attempts to establish social accounting as an intrinsic feature of organisational behaviour. The reports of Social Audit Ltd in the 1970s on e.g. Tube Investments, Avon Rubber and Coalite and Chemical, laid the foundations for much of the later work on social audits.

=== Reporting areas ===
Unlike in financial accounting, the matter of interest is by definition less clear-cut in social accounting; this is due to an aspired all-encompassing approach to corporate activity. It is generally agreed that social accounting will cover an organisation's relationship with the natural environment, its employees, and ethical issues concentrating upon consumers and products, as well as local and international communities. Other issues include corporate action on questions of ethnicity and gender.

=== Audience ===
Social accounting supersedes the traditional audit audience, which is mainly composed of a company's shareholders and the financial community, by providing information to all of the organisation's stakeholders. A stakeholder of an organisation is anyone who can influence or is influenced by the organisation. This often includes, but is not limited to, suppliers of inputs, employees and trade unions, consumers, members of local communities, society at large and governments. Different stakeholders have different rights of information. These rights can be stipulated by law, but also by non-legal codes, corporate values, mission statements and moral rights. The rights of information are thus determined by "society, the organisation and its stakeholders".

== Methods ==
Methods used in promoting social accountability and awareness include the following:

- social audit
- citizen score card (CSC)
- public hearing
- Public expenditure tracking survey (PETS)
- citizen charter
- complaint system

== Environmental accounting ==
Environmental accounting, which is a subset of social accounting, focuses on the cost structure and environmental performance of a company. It principally describes the preparation, presentation, and communication of information related to an organisation's interaction with the natural environment. Although environmental accounting is most commonly undertaken as voluntary self-reporting by companies, third-party reports by government agencies, NGOs and other bodies posit to pressure for environmental accountability.

Accounting for impacts on the environment may occur within a company's financial statements, relating to liabilities, commitments and contingencies for the remediation of contaminated lands or other financial concerns arising from pollution. Such reporting essentially expresses financial issues arising from environmental legislation. More typically, environmental accounting describes the reporting of quantitative and detailed environmental data within the non-financial sections of the annual report or in separate (including online) environmental reports. Such reports may account for pollution emissions, resources used, or wildlife habitat damaged or re-established.

In their reports, large companies commonly place primary emphasis on eco-efficiency, referring to the reduction of resource and energy use and waste production per unit of product or service. A complete picture which accounts for all inputs, outputs and wastes of the organisation, must not necessarily emerge. Whilst companies can often demonstrate great success in eco-efficiency, their ecological footprint, that is an estimate of total environmental impact, may move independently following changes in output.

Legislation for compulsory environmental reporting exists in some form e.g. in Denmark, Netherlands, Australia, the UK and Korea. In June 2012, the UK coalition government announced the introduction of mandatory carbon reporting, requiring all UK companies listed on the Main Market of the London Stock Exchange – around 1,100 of the UK's largest listed companies – to report their greenhouse gas emissions every year. Deputy Prime Minister Nick Clegg confirmed that emission reporting rules would come into effect from April 2013 in his piece for The Guardian. However, the date was eventually moved back to 1 October 2013.

The United Nations has been highly involved in the adoption of environmental accounting practices, most notably in the United Nations Division for Sustainable Development publication "Environmental Management Accounting Procedures and Principles".

== Applications ==
Social accounting is a widespread practice in a number of large organisations in the United Kingdom. Royal Dutch Shell, BP, British Telecom, The Co-operative Bank, The Body Shop, and United Utilities all publish independently audited social and sustainability accounts. In many instances the reports are produced in (partial or full) compliance with the sustainability reporting guidelines set by the Global Reporting Initiative (GRI) and indexes including EthicalQuote (CEQ) (reputation tracking of the world's largest companies on Environmental, Social, Governance (ESG), Corporate Social Responsibility, ethics and sustainability). Traidcraft plc, the fair trade organisation, claims to be the first public limited company to publish audited social accounts in the UK, starting in 1993.

The website of the Centre for Social and Environmental Accounting Research contains a collection of exemplary reporting practices and social audits.

== History ==
Modern forms of social accounting first produced widespread interest in the 1970s, as the practice emerged in North America in the particular case of environmental reporting. Its concepts received serious consideration from professional and academic accounting bodies, e.g. the Accounting Standards Board's predecessor, the American Accounting Association and the American Institute of Certified Public Accountants.

Business-representative bodies, e.g. the Confederation of British Industry, likewise approached the issue. In Europe there was widespread experimentation with new forms of social accounting and reporting with wide differences between the various countries

In 1981 Freer Spreckley produced a short book entitled Social Audit: A Management Tool for Co-operative Working designed as an internal organisational social accounting and audit model specifically for social enterprises who wished to measure their social, environmental and financial performance. This was the basis for the Co-operative Bank and Shell Corporation's social performance reports in the UK and subsequently many other private sector companies social responsibility reporting. In The Netherlands social reporting referred more to the provision of information on the relations between an organization and its employees: many Dutch corporations published such reports

Abt Associates, the American consultancy firm, is one of the most cited early examples of businesses that experimented with social accounting. In the 1970s Abt Associates conducted a series of social audits incorporated into its annual reports. The social concerns addressed included "productivity, contribution to knowledge, employment security, fairness of employment opportunities, health, education and self-development, physical security, transportation, recreation, and environment". The social audits expressed Abt Associates performance in this areas in financial terms and thus aspired to determine the company's net social impact in balance sheet form. Other examples of early applications include Laventhol and Horwath, then a reputable accounting firm, and the First National Bank of Minneapolis (now U.S. Bancorp).

== Non-financial reporting rules ==
Social accounting practices have only rarely been codified in legislation; examples include the French bilan social and the United Kingdom's 2006 Companies Act. Interest in social accounting cooled off in the 1980s and was only resurrected in the mid-1990s, partly nurtured by growing ecological and environmental awareness.

The European Union's Directive 2013/34/EU is concerned with disclosure of non-financial and diversity information by certain large undertakings and groups, as amended by Directive 2014/95/EU of the European Parliament and of the Council of 22 October 2014. The directives provide for "a certain minimum legal requirement as regards the extent of the information that should be made available to the public and authorities by undertakings across the Union" and require "undertakings subject to this Directive" to give "a fair and comprehensive view of their policies, outcomes, and risks". Undertakings subject to the Directive are those with an average of over 500 employees during the reporting year. The directive is supported by non-binding guidelines on reporting methodology published by the European Commission on 26 June 2017. There are about 2000 companies (excluding exempted subsidiaries) affected by the requirements of the directive.

Under United Kingdom law, this area of regulation is covered by the Companies, Partnerships and Groups (Accounts and Non-Financial Reporting) Regulations 2016.

== See also ==
- Accountancy
- Centre for Social and Environmental Accounting Research
- Corporate social responsibility
- Corporate sustainability
- Democracy
- Environmental audit
- Environmental economics
- Human resource accounting
- Overlapping generations model
- Socially responsible investing
- Social accounting and auditing
- Social return on investment
- Sustainability measurement
- United Nations Global Compact
