= Yves Gendron =

Canadian accounting academic

Prof. Yves Gendron
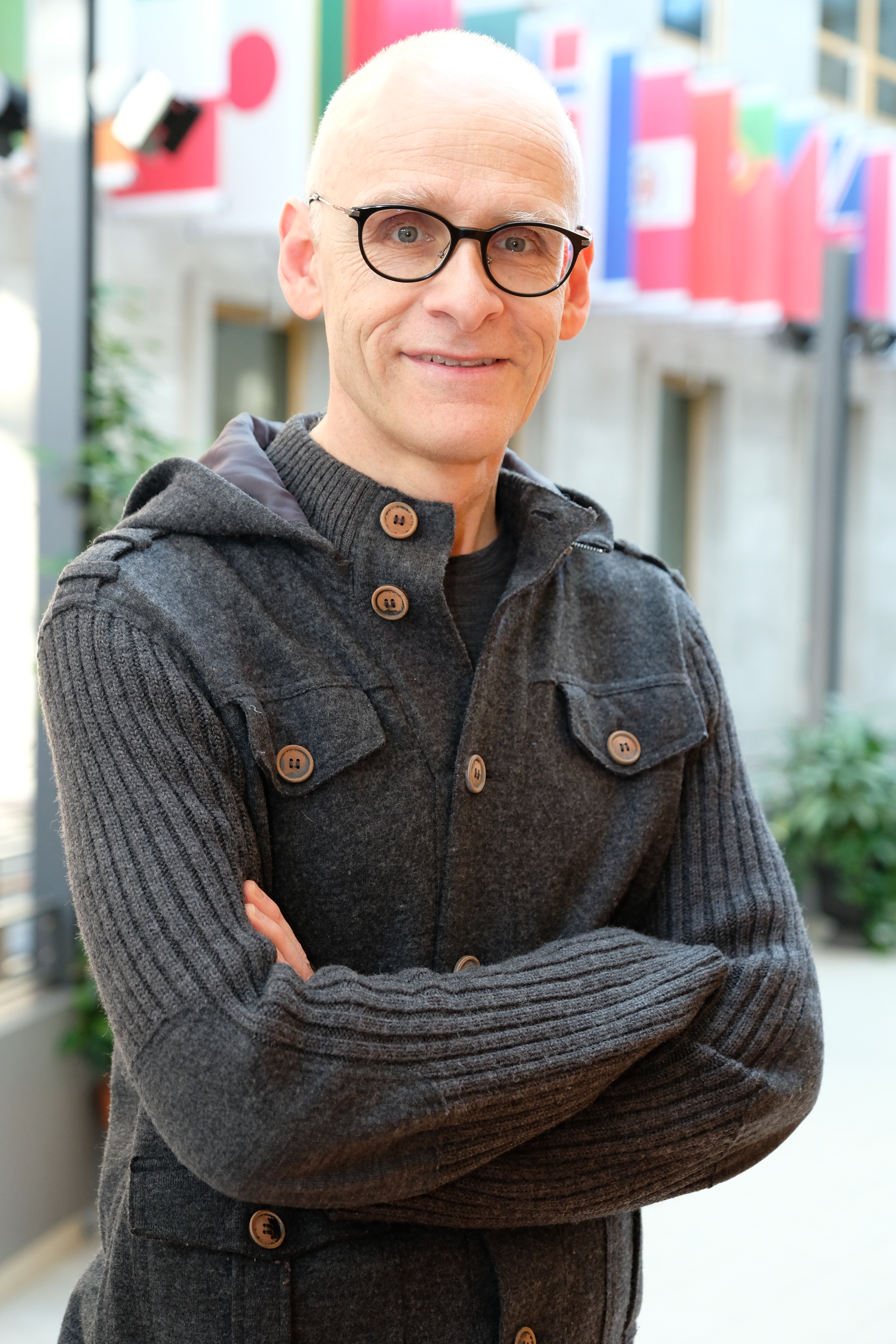
- Gendron in 2018
- Education: Laval University (PhD)
- Known for: Qualitative research; Interpretive accounting research
- Spouse(s): criminologist Joane Martel, Laval University
- Scientific career
- Fields: Accounting, auditing
- Workplaces: Alberta Business School, University of Alberta (1998-2006); Faculty of Business Administration, Laval University (2006-present)
- Notable students: Bertrand Malsch; Marie-Soleil Tremblay; Claire-France Picard

Yves Gendron is a Canadian accounting academic at Laval University in Quebec. He is a qualitative researcher, largely known for his studies in corporate governance, social accountability of auditors, and professional legitimacy. He is co-editor-in-chief of Critical Perspectives on Accounting.

== Doctorate Honoris Causa ==
Gendron began his university studies in 1982 at Université du Québec where he obtained, in 1985, his Bachelor's Degree in Business Administration with a specialization in accounting. He became a CA in 1987. Post-certification, he spent most of 1992 completing propaedeutic courses at Laval University in order to meet the requirements of admission to the PhD program. He completed his PhD in Science Administration at Laval University from 1993 to 1997. His thesis was dedicated to the decision of accepting new clients in audit firms as a result of a compromise between logics of action. Although his thesis was mainly audit-focused, it also addressed professional concerns in relation to the application of accounting standards. Gendron then completed post-doctoral studies at the University of Alberta in 1998.

== Career ==
Prior to entering academia, Gendron worked as an auditor for Samson Bélair and Deloitte & Touche in Rimouski. Following his PhD, he joined the faculty of the University of Alberta, serving there from 1998 to 2006. Gendron then moved to Laval University, becoming full professor in 2008.

Gendron became co-editor-in-chief of the peer-reviewed accounting journal Critical Perspectives on Accounting in January 2014, and is an editor and editorial board member of several other accounting journals.

== Research ==
Gendron does qualitative research that examines the daily lives of auditors, focusing on how they make decisions or how they handle stress. His work also looks at the legitimization processes that surround public accountants’ claims to expertise, particularly in emerging fields of practice such as performance measurement, online auditing, and consulting.

Gendron has also studied:

- Corporate governance, focusing on the role of audit committees and compensation committees
- The relationship between research and practice
- The emergence of interpretive accounting research
- Performativity pressures in academia

== Selected publications ==
These articles have all been cited over 100 times, according to Google Scholar:

- Malsch, B., & Gendron, Y. (2013). Re‐theorizing change: Institutional experimentation and the struggle for domination in the field of public accounting. Journal of Management Studies, 50(5), 870-899.
- Bédard, J., & Gendron, Y. (2010). Strengthening the financial reporting system: Can audit committees deliver? International Journal of Auditing, 14(2), 174-210.
- Suddaby, R., Gendron, Y., & Lam, H. (2009). The organizational context of professionalism in accounting. Accounting, Organizations and Society, 34(3-4), 409-427.
- Gendron, Y. (2008). Constituting the academic performer: the spectre of superficiality and stagnation in academia. European Accounting Review, 17(1), 97-127.
- Gendron, Y., Cooper, D. J., & Townley, B. (2007). The construction of auditing expertise in measuring government performance. Accounting, Organizations and Society, 32(1-2), 101-129.
- Gendron, Y., & Bédard, J. (2006). On the constitution of audit committee effectiveness. Accounting, Organizations and Society, 31(3), 211-239.
- Gendron, Y., Suddaby, R., & Lam, H. (2006). An examination of the ethical commitment of professional accountants to auditor independence. Journal of Business Ethics, 64(2), 169-193.
- Gendron, Y., Bedard, J., & Gosselin, M. (2004). Getting inside the black box: A field study of practices in “effective” audit committees. Auditing: A Journal of Practice & Theory, 23(1), 153-171.
- Gendron, Y., Cooper, D. J., & Townley, B. (2001). In the name of accountability: State auditing, independence and new public management. Accounting, Auditing & Accountability Journal, 14(3), 278-310.

== Awards ==
- 2019 Haim Falk Award for Distinguished Contribution to Accounting Thought
- 2017 Mary Parker Follett Award, Winner, for "Gender on board: deconstructing the 'legitimate' female director" (with M.-S. Tremblay and B. Malsch), Accounting, Auditing & Accountability Journal, 29(1), 165-190.
- 2009, 2010, 2012, 2015-2017 Socrate Distinction for teaching, Laval University
- 2016 Citations of Excellence Award, Winner, for "Re-theorizing change: Institutional experimentation and the struggle for domination in the field of public accounting" (with B. Malsch), Journal of Management Studies, 50(5), 870-899.
- 2016 Hermès award for excellence in teaching, Faculty of Business Administration, Laval University
- 2010-2016 Research Medal, Laval University
- 2015 Mary Parker Follett Award, Winner, for "From meticulous professionals to superheroes of the business world" (with S. Durocher and C.-F. Picard), Accounting, Auditing & Accountability Journal, 27(1), 73-118.
- 2012 Mary Parker Follett Award, Highly Commended, for "Investigating interdisciplinary translations: The influence of Pierre Bourdieu on accounting literature" (with B. Malsch and F. Grazzini), Accounting, Auditing & Accountability Journal, 24(2), 194-228.
- 2011 Outstanding Reviewer Award, Accounting, Auditing & Accountability Journal
- 2011 Hermès award for excellence in research, Faculty of Business Administration, Laval University
- 2005 Mary Parker Follett Award, Highly Commended, for "Analysis of a failed jurisdictional claim: The rhetoric and politics surrounding the AICPA global credential project" (with W.E. Shafer), Accounting, Auditing & Accountability Journal, 18(4), 453-491.
