= Post–earnings-announcement drift =

Phenomenon in economics and accounting

In financial economics and accounting research, post–earnings-announcement drift or PEAD (also named the SUE effect) is the tendency for a stock's cumulative abnormal returns to drift in the direction of an earnings surprise for several weeks (even several months) following an earnings announcement. This phenomenon is one of the oldest and most persistent capital market anomalies, with evidence dating back to the late 1960s.

== History and Discovery ==
PEAD was first documented by Ball and Brown in their seminal 1968 study. They found that after an earnings announcement, stock prices continue to drift in the direction of the earnings surprise for an extended period, suggesting that market participants do not immediately incorporate all information from earnings announcements. This finding challenged the efficient market hypothesis, which implies that new information should be rapidly reflected in stock prices.

The drift is quite persistent. Bernard and Thomas (1989) report that the spread in average return between stocks in the top and bottom deciles in standardized unexpected earnings (SUE) is positive in 41 of the 48 quarters from 1974 to 1985 and in 11 of the 16 quarters in which returns on the NYSE index are negative.

== Cause and Effect ==
Once a firm's current earnings become known, the information content should be quickly digested by investors and incorporated into the efficient market price. However, it has long been known that this is not exactly what happens. For firms that report good news in quarterly earnings, their abnormal security returns tend to drift upwards for at least 60 days following their earnings announcement. Similarly, firms that report bad news in earnings tend to have their abnormal security returns drift downwards for a similar period.

A particularly notable feature of PEAD is that a disproportionate amount of drift is concentrated around the three subsequent quarterly earnings announcements following the initial surprise, suggesting a predictable pattern of price movements. Bernard and Thomas (1990) found that approximately 25-30% of the post-earnings announcement drift occurs during the three-day windows surrounding subsequent earnings announcements, despite these windows representing only about 5% of trading days.

According to Bernard and Thomas (1989), PEAD occurs because investors fail "to recognize fully the implications of current earnings for future earnings." In other words, investors underreact to the information in current earnings that informs predictions of future earnings.

== Measurement and Detection ==
Several methods exist to measure earnings surprises and detect PEAD:

1. Standardized Unexpected Earnings (SUE) - The difference between actual earnings and expected earnings (based on analyst forecasts or time-series models), normalized by the standard deviation of earnings.
2. Cumulative Abnormal Returns (CARs) - Measuring the cumulative abnormal returns around earnings announcements.
3. Overnight Returns (OR) - More recent research has shown that overnight returns following earnings announcements can be effective in capturing unexpected information and measuring earnings surprises.

Researchers sometimes define earnings surprise (UE) using a seasonal random-walk model, calculated as the difference between the most recent quarterly earnings and the quarterly earnings four quarters earlier, scaled by the market capitalization from four quarters earlier.

== Time-Series Properties of Quarterly Earnings ==
Research by Bernard and Thomas (1990) documents that quarterly earnings have a systematic time-series pattern that can predict future abnormal returns. Specifically:

1. Seasonal differences in quarterly earnings (comparing the same quarter year-over-year) show positive autocorrelations for the first three lags that decline in magnitude:

- First-order autocorrelation: approximately 0.34
- Second-order autocorrelation: approximately 0.19
- Third-order autocorrelation: approximately 0.06

2. At the fourth lag, there is a negative autocorrelation of approximately -0.24, suggesting that a portion of an earnings change tends to reverse four quarters later.

This autocorrelation structure suggests that earnings changes are partially predictable based on past quarters' results. For example, if a company reports a positive earnings surprise in the current quarter, this pattern would predict positive but declining earnings surprises in the next three quarters, followed by a negative surprise in the fourth subsequent quarter.

== Liquidity and Zero-Leverage Firms ==
Liquidity plays a crucial role in the magnitude and persistence of PEAD. Research shows that PEAD is stronger in firms with higher illiquidity levels and information asymmetry. In particular, zero-leverage firms (companies with no outstanding debt) exhibit stronger PEAD effects.

A study of zero-leverage firms listed on the FTSE 350 index over the period 2000-2015 found that:

1. Illiquidity levels are significantly enhanced around both the earnings and post-announcement period for zero-leverage firms, with larger bid-ask spreads and higher price impact ratios.
2. When bid-ask spread components are decomposed, adverse selection costs increase significantly during earnings announcements, while inventory holding and order processing costs remain unchanged, suggesting that PEAD is primarily related to information asymmetry.
3. The relationship between PEAD returns, earnings surprises, and liquidity costs remains robust even after controlling for firm characteristics such as size, stock price, and trading volume.

Zero-leverage firms face greater information asymmetry and less public information compared to levered firms, making the information obtained from earnings announcements particularly important for these firms. Consequently, they exhibit greater PEAD effects than companies with debt and equity in their capital structure.

== Delayed Disclosure Impact ==
One significant factor affecting PEAD is the delayed disclosure of financial statement items in earnings announcements. When companies delay complete financial statement disclosure until their formal 10-Q filings, investors and analysts demonstrate a delayed response to earnings news.

Key findings regarding delayed disclosure include:

1. Higher delayed disclosure (DD) is associated with a weaker immediate market reaction to earnings surprises and a stronger post-earnings announcement drift. Specifically, an increase in DD from zero to one corresponds to approximately a 37% decrease in the earnings response coefficient (ERC) and a 42% increase in PEAD.
2. The delayed reaction persists even after the 10-Q filing when the previously withheld information becomes available. The full correction of the price only occurs at the next earnings announcement, suggesting that "opportunity knocks but once" - firms have a special opportunity to convey value-relevant information at earnings announcements when investor attention is high.
3. Analysts are less likely to issue earnings forecasts immediately after earnings announcements and more likely to delay their forecasts to after the 10-Q filing when financial statement disclosure is delayed. This delayed response pattern persists beyond the 10-Q filing and continues until the next earnings announcement.
4. Higher delayed disclosure is associated with greater analyst underreaction to earnings surprises, lower forecast accuracy, and higher forecast dispersion, indicating that the lack of complete financial information impedes analysts' ability to process earnings news effectively.

A limited attention model suggests that delayed disclosure increases arbitrage risk for attentive investors by increasing uncertainty about firm value at the earnings announcement date. As a result, attentive investors trade less aggressively, leading to a lower immediate reaction to earnings news and greater PEAD.

== Hypotheses ==
The phenomenon can be explained with a number of hypotheses which fall into two main categories:

=== Risk-Based Rational Explanations ===
Some researchers suggest that PEAD represents compensation for unobservable priced risk. According to this view, the returns to PEAD strategies are simply compensation for bearing some form of underlying risk.

Several risk factors have been proposed:

- Changes in equities' risk following earnings announcements
- Inflation risk in forecasting future earnings growth
- Relationship to future macroeconomic activity
- Liquidity risk
- Divergence in investor opinion as additional risk

Kim and Kim (2003) constructed a risk factor related to unexpected earnings surprises and found that a four-factor model including this new factor reduced a substantial portion of PEAD.

=== Expected Growth Risk Explanation ===
Kim, Lee, and Min (2017) suggest that expected growth risk can explain PEAD. Using Johnson's (2002) theoretical model, they argue that the log price-dividend ratio is convex with respect to expected growth rates. This convexity implies that stock returns are more sensitively affected by changes in expected growth when expected growth is higher.

Their research found that:

1. Firms with higher SUE have higher expected growth rates
2. High-SUE portfolios have greater exposure to expected growth risk than low-SUE portfolios
3. Expected growth risk is significantly priced in the cross-section of returns
4. A model including expected growth risk alone explains PEAD satisfactorily

=== Mispricing Due to Delayed Price Response ===
This hypothesis suggests that PEAD results from a delayed price response or investor under-reaction to earnings news. The delay may be due to:

1. Limits-to-arbitrage - Trading frictions, transaction costs, and limited arbitrage prevent rapid price adjustment. Studies show that PEAD is more pronounced for stocks with:
  - Higher transaction costs (bid-ask spreads)
  - Lower share price and trading volume
  - Lower institutional ownership
  - Less analyst coverage
  - Higher idiosyncratic volatility
2. Investor bias - Behavioral explanations suggest that investors systematically underreact to earnings-related news. Bernard and Thomas (1990) find that PEAD is caused by investors failing to incorporate the implications of current earnings for future earnings.

Francis et al. (2007) reveal that under-reaction to earnings announcements causes the PEAD. Some investors may overreact to their private information and underweight public earnings reports.

=== Naive Earnings Expectation Hypothesis ===
Bernard and Thomas (1990) provide compelling evidence that stock prices fail to fully reflect the implications of current earnings for future earnings. They hypothesize that stock prices partially reflect a naive earnings expectation model (seasonal random walk), where investors expect earnings to be similar to the same quarter of the previous year, without fully accounting for the time-series properties of earnings.

Key findings supporting this hypothesis include:

1. The three-day abnormal returns around subsequent earnings announcements are predictable based on the current quarter's earnings surprise
2. The pattern of these predictable returns matches the autocorrelation structure of quarterly earnings
3. Three-day abnormal returns are positive but declining in magnitude for the next three quarterly announcements, and then negative for the fourth subsequent announcement, precisely matching what would be expected if investors failed to account for the time-series properties of earnings

The evidence is remarkably consistent across firm size categories, though the effect is more pronounced for small firms. This pattern persisted consistently over the researchers' 13-year sample period (1974-1986).

== Price Impact and Market Microstructure ==
Research examining the UK stock market by Zhang et al. (2024) provides evidence of the role price impact plays in PEAD. Their findings reveal:

1. Price continuations following buys and reversals following sales are present around the earnings announcement period.
2. Buy orders have a larger price impact than sell orders around earnings announcements, creating an asymmetry that contributes to PEAD.
3. PEAD and asymmetric price effects jointly affect stock returns during the post-earnings announcement period.
4. The asymmetric price impact persists even after controlling for bid-ask bounce, indicating that earnings drift genuinely affects stock prices.

The authors decomposed bid-ask spreads into three components (adverse selection, inventory holding, and order processing costs) and found that only adverse selection costs increased significantly during earnings announcements, while the other components remained unchanged. This provides evidence that information asymmetry is the primary driver of PEAD rather than changes in inventory holding or order processing costs.

Recent studies have found a U-shaped relationship between firm characteristics and earnings surprise deciles, with extreme deciles (both highest and lowest surprises) typically having smaller firm sizes, lower trading volumes, and higher bid-ask spreads compared to middle deciles.

== Time-Series Properties and Historical Changes ==
Research has documented significant changes in PEAD over time:

=== Declining Magnitude ===
The magnitude of PEAD has declined significantly over time, and may have even disappeared in recent years. Specifically:

- The spread in average returns between high and low SUE portfolios has decreased substantially from the 1980s/1990s (about 5%) to the late 2010s (3% or lower)
- This decline is not uniform across all time periods; Richardson et al. (2010) found that while PEAD became weaker until 2002, this declining trend did not continue in the 2003-2008 period

=== Explanations for Decline ===
Two main explanations exist for the decline in PEAD:

1. Increased arbitrage trading - The prevailing explanation suggests that increased liquidity has allowed arbitrage investors to trade more aggressively on the PEAD signal, thereby decreasing the price drift.
2. Declining earnings persistence - Research by Kettell, McInnis, and Zhao (2022) proposes that declining earnings persistence is a key driver behind PEAD attenuation. They found that:
- The persistence of standardized unexpected earnings (SUE) has declined significantly over time
- SUE persistence is significantly associated with variation in PEAD
- After controlling for declining SUE persistence, the declining trend in PEAD becomes statistically insignificant
- The proportion of firms staying in extreme SUE deciles has declined dramatically over time

== Trading Strategies ==
PEAD creates potential profit opportunities for traders and investors. Strategies typically involve:

1. Sorting stocks into quantiles based on their earnings surprises
2. Taking long positions in stocks with positive surprises and/or short positions in stocks with negative surprises
3. Holding these positions over a relatively long period (several weeks to months)

Bernard and Thomas (1990) documented that zero-investment portfolios constructed on the basis of earnings surprises generated abnormal returns of approximately 8-9% over a quarter (or about 35% annualized before transaction costs). Even higher abnormal returns (about 67% annualized) were available when portfolios were constructed 15 days prior to subsequent earnings announcements and held through those announcements.

Trading strategies based on earnings surprises have historically provided valuable information to investors and generated excess returns. Some studies have shown these strategies can yield quarterly returns in excess of 6% in certain markets, particularly when combined with measures of investor attention.

Research by Garfinkel, Hribar, and Hsiao (2024) finds that a hedge portfolio going long in the top SUE decile (Good News) and short in the bottom SUE decile (Bad News) generates a risk-adjusted return of 5.1% over three months, which translates to an annual return of over 20%. The return to the PEAD trading strategy has been documented to be approximately between 8.76% and 43.08% annually in previous studies.

However, research suggests that the magnitude of PEAD has been declining in developed markets, particularly in the US, possibly due to increased market efficiency and increased institutional investor focus on this anomaly.

== Text-Based PEAD: An Alternative Perspective ==
Recent research by Meursault et al. (2021) introduces a new numerical measure of earnings announcement surprises called standardized unexpected earnings call text (SUE.txt), which does not explicitly incorporate reported earnings values. Their measure generates a text-based post-earnings-announcement drift (PEAD.txt) that is larger than classic PEAD, particularly in recent years.

The researchers find that SUE.txt has a stronger association with abnormal returns than classic SUE in panel regressions. The PEAD.txt portfolio held for a quarter generates larger alpha than the traditional PEAD portfolio within the Fama-French five factors plus momentum framework.

Key findings include:

- At every calendar quarter mark, PEAD.txt is notably larger than traditional PEAD
- SUE.txt flexibly summarizes good news and bad news about firms and their environment contained in earnings calls
- Text and numbers compress primitive data in different ways and are neither completely orthogonal nor identical
- The magnitude of PEAD.txt relative to PEAD highlights how textual information may capture important aspects of firm value that numeric earnings alone do not reflect

This research suggests that a more meaningful distinction between textual information and earnings might be its form (unstructured compared to structured) rather than substance.

== The Short-Duration Premium and PEAD ==
Research by Beckmeyer and Meyerhof (2022) connects PEAD to the short-duration premium in stocks. Their study examines whether this premium arises due to risk or alternative explanations.

Their key findings include:

1. Long-duration stocks (those expected to generate most cash flows in the distant future) have the lowest institutional ownership, are most overvalued according to mispricing measures, and exhibit large forecast errors at earnings announcements
2. The short-duration premium is particularly pronounced surrounding individual earnings announcements, where it manifests as a significant price correction of long-duration stocks
3. This price correction only appears in stocks with low institutional ownership, suggesting it stems from overvaluation due to sentiment-driven trading by non-institutional investors rather than rational risk pricing
4. Market sentiment significantly predicts time variation in the duration premium, with the short-duration premium being most pronounced after periods of high market sentiment

This research provides evidence that the short-duration premium and its relationship to earnings announcements might be explained by behavioral factors rather than risk-based explanations.

== SOX Impact on PEAD ==
The implementation of the Sarbanes-Oxley Act (SOX) has been found to impact PEAD. Research shows:

1. Post-SOX, there is a faster market reaction to earnings announcements in the short window (-1,0), indicating increased investor confidence in financial information
2. In longer windows (+2,+60), market reactions show lower abnormal returns after SOX, suggesting reduced opportunity for post-announcement drift
3. SOX improved the information environment through enhanced financial reporting quality, strengthened audit committees, increased board oversight, and CEO/CFO certification requirements

== Individual Investor Behavior ==
Some research has examined whether individual investors drive PEAD. One theory suggests that if individual investors are the source of drift, they would tend to be net buyers after negative earnings surprises and net sellers after positive earnings surprises, thus impeding full price adjustment. However, studies have found that individuals are actually significant net buyers after both negative and positive earnings surprises, contradicting this theory.

Instead, empirical evidence suggests that individual investors may exhibit an "earnings attention effect," where the magnitude of earnings surprise affects trading volume but not necessarily the direction of trades.

== Recent AI Applications ==
Recent research has explored applying artificial intelligence to predict PEAD. Garfinkel, Hribar, and Hsiao (2024) examined whether AI can perform financial analysis on visual representations of earnings data to predict PEAD in a manner orthogonal to traditional drift predictors. They transformed firms' historical quarterly earnings into bar chart images and employed a convolutional neural network (CNN) to extract predictive features.

Their findings indicate that:

1. Firms in the highest CNN buy probability decile significantly outperform firms in the lowest CNN buy probability decile by 3.6% in the 63-day post-announcement window
2. The drift-predicting power of CNN buy features is robust to various controls for risk and distinct from previously documented anomalies
3. AI features positively predict one-quarter-ahead earnings growth and the three-day abnormal return surrounding the next earnings announcement

Their study highlights the potential of applying deep learning techniques to visualized financial data for predicting earnings-based anomalies.

== Aggregation Bias in PEAD Research ==
Recent research by Katz, McCubbins, and McMullin (2018) raises concerns about how PEAD is traditionally measured. They argue that portfolio analysis introduces an aggregation bias that clouds inferences about firm-level stock price behavior.

Their key findings include:

1. The traditional PEAD portfolio analysis masks significant heterogeneity in firm-level returns
2. As returns are disaggregated, the monotonic relationship between earnings surprise and returns fades
3. Firm-level PEADs do not consistently vary with unexpected earnings as theory would predict
4. In the "Good News" portfolio, only 51.8% of observations have positive returns, while in the "Bad News" portfolio, only 58.3% have negative returns

This research suggests that the PEAD may not exist when returns are disaggregated and raises questions about whether PEAD is truly an anomaly of market efficiency or just an artifact of aggregation.

== Economic Significance ==
The magnitude of PEAD represents a significant anomaly in market efficiency. Bernard and Thomas (1990) found that three-day announcement-period returns on portfolios constructed with only prior-quarter earnings information were approximately half as large as the returns to portfolios constructed using the contemporaneous earnings information. This finding calls into question the reliability of studies that rely heavily on the assumption that prices fully reflect all publicly available earnings information.

Bernard and Thomas (1990) investigated several alternative explanations for PEAD, including risk shifts and research design flaws, but found evidence inconsistent with these alternatives. The consistency of the PEAD effect across 13 consecutive years in their sample, with abnormal returns showing the predicted pattern in almost every year, presents a substantial challenge to rational explanations of the phenomenon.

== See also ==
- Stochastic drift
- Style drift
- Earnings response coefficient
- Momentum
- Market efficiency
- Investor attention
- Deep learning in finance
