= Ganna Pogrebna =

British behavioral scientist, author

- Born: 4 July 1980 (age 46)
- Education: University of Missouri; University of Innsbruck
- Occupations: Behavioral scientist; Author; Educator
- Website: gannapogrebna.com

Ganna Pogrebna (born 4 July 1980) is a British-Australian economist, behavioural data scientist, decision theorist, educator, author, and academic writer. She currently serves as David Trimble Chair in Leadership and Organisational Transformation at Queen's University Belfast, the Lead for Behavioral Data Science at the Alan Turing Institute, Non-Residential Fellow at Australian Strategic Policy Institute (ASPI), and an Honorary Professor of Behavioral Business Analytics and Data Science at the University of Sydney.

She is known for her work in combining data science methods with those from economics and psychology to model human behavior under risk and uncertainty. She is a co-editor of the Cambridge Handbook of Behavioural Data Science.

== Education ==
Pogrebna holds a master's degree in economics from the University of Missouri, Kansas City, and has obtained her Ph.D. in economics and social sciences from the University of Innsbruck, Austria.

== Career ==
Pogrebna is a researcher and academic in behavioral data science, decision theory, risk modelling, and human-machine teaming. She is currently a Professor at Queen's University Belfast. Additionally, she is a Lead of Behavioral Data Science at the Alan Turing Institute in London, holds a research professorship position at the University of Sydney Business School. She is also a fellow at the Australian Strategic Policy Institute (ASPI) . Until August 2025, she served as Executive Director of the Artificial Intelligence and Cyber Futures Institute.

Pogrebna has taught and supervised students in data science, cyber security, behavioral data science, business analytics and artificial intelligence. She has also worked as a consultant for private and public sector companies in various industries. Pogrebna communicates her research through her Behavioural Data Science Week newsletter on LinkedIn, YouTube blog "Data Driven" and "Inclusion AI. Blog", and is a regular contributor to various blogs and media outlets. She is methods editor at Leadership Quarterly, editor at Scientific Reports and associate editor of Judgement and Decision Making.

== Notable research works ==
In 2021, her team's box office predicting technology was discussed at the Stockholm Film Festival. In 2018, she co-developed a model predicting parental risk attitudes based on the characteristics of children, revealing gender inequalities in parenting. In 2019, she contributed to a Council of Europe study on the implications of advanced digital technologies for human rights. In 2020-2021, she researched handwashing patterns and protected vulnerable groups during the COVID-19 pandemic. In 2022, Pogrebna's work highlighted the threats and benefits of software products used in schools and at home. Her work also emphasised the critical role of AI in discovering new cancer biomarkers by integrating complex biological data, while also cautioning against the risks of embedded algorithmic bias in medical diagnostics.

In 2023-2024, Pogrebna has advanced the strategic use of digital twins by demonstrating their value in simulating complex change scenarios for business and policy. In 2024, in analysing behavioural barriers to electric vehicle uptake, Pogrebna identified “charger anxiety” as a dominant psychological factor driving Australians toward hybrid cars, highlighting infrastructure and trust gaps in sustainable mobility transitions. She also contributed to environmental AI applications by demonstrating how machine learning can be used to trace sources of waterborne pollution and support regulatory enforcement, including dynamic tracking of plastic “islands” in river deltas.

In 2024, she led a landmark multi-institutional study examining the career trajectories of 757 women leaders across race, time, and sector, showing that Black women are more likely to take career risks early in their professional lives—a finding with significant implications for diversity and leadership development strategies. Pogrebna’s research explored how algorithmic misogyny and early negative experiences with AI systems shape long-term disengagement and digital distrust among women, contributing to a widening gender gap in technology adoption.

In 2025, Pogrebna’s work on nuclear decision-making leverages human-machine teaming modelling and digital twin technologies to reduce the risk of escalation and miscalculation in high-stakes geopolitical environments. As part of the European Leadership Network’s Nuclear and New Technologies (NNT) Project, Pogrebna co-led the development of a prototype digital twin designed to simulate crisis scenarios across nuclear command, control, and communication (NC3) systems.

== Bibliography ==
- Navigating New Cyber Risks: How Businesses can Plan, Build and Manage Safe Spaces in the Digital Age, co-author (2019)
- Big Bad Bias Book (2025)
- The Cambridge Handbook of Behavioural Data Science (2006)

== Awards and honours ==
- British Academy of Management Award (2018)
- Pogrebna's work in risk analytics and modeling has been recognized through the Leverhulme Research Fellowship award.
- In January 2020, she was named the winner of TechWomen100, an award for leading female experts in Science, Technology, Engineering, and Mathematics in the UK.
- She has also been named one of the 20+ Inspiring Data Scientists by AI Time Journal.
- In 2024 she won the Women in AI Asia-Pacific Award for her work in Risk and Cybersecurity.
- In 2024 Pogrebna was a Finalist in the AI Leader of the Year category at the Australian AI Awards 2024.
- In 2025 Pogrebna received an AI in Cyber Security Champion Award at the Australian Women in Security Awards.
