= Robert Gray (accountancy academic) =

Robert Hugh Gray (died June 2020) was Professor of Social and Environmental Accounting at the University of St Andrews in Scotland. He was also the Director of the Centre for Social and Environmental Accounting Research (CSEAR).

In the 2009 Birthday Honours list Gray was appointed Member of the Order of the British Empire (MBE).

Gray was responsible for raising awareness of social and environmental injustice around the world.

== Honours and awards ==
- 1982: Will Baxter Manuscript Prize (with A.J.B. Hope) for "Power and Policy Making: The Development of an R&D Standard" Journal of Business Finance & Accounting Vol.9 No.4 Winter 1982 (pp. 531–558)
- 1992: Larry Sawyer Manuscript Award (with D.J. Collison)"The Environmental Audit: Green-gauge or Whitewash?" Managerial Auditing 6(5) 1991 (pp. 17–25)
- 1994: Nominated for United Nations Global 500 Laureate – not awarded.
- 1994: Award for Environmental Excellence from Dundee City Council for work with CSEAR
- 1994: British Accounting Association Special Interest Group Manuscript Award for "Teaching Ethics and the Ethics of Accounting Teaching: Educating for immorality and a case for social and environmental accounting education"" (with K.J. Bebbington & K. McPhail) Accounting Education: An International Journal 3(1) Spring 1994 (pp. 51–75)
- 1995: Shortlisted for British Accounting Association/Chartered Association of Certified Accountants inaugural Outstanding Educators Award
- 1995: Mary Parker Follett Manuscript Award – "Highly Commended" for "Corporate Social and Environmental Reporting: A Review of the Literature and a longitudinal study of UK Disclosure" (with R. Kouhy and S. Lavers) Accounting, Auditing and Accountability Journal 8(2) 1995 (pp. 47–77)
- 1996: The Research Assessment Exercise of 1996 gave the research work of CSEAR a "flagged" status.
- 1997: University of Dundee Honorary Graduates Award for Innovative Teaching (jointly awarded with K.J. Bebbington) for the development of teaching methods, textbook and seminar exercises for introductory financial accounting.
- 1997: Mary Parker Follett Manuscript Award – "Highly Commended" for "Struggling with the praxis of social accounting: Stakeholders, accountability, audits and procedures" (with C. Dey, D. Owen, R. Evans and S. Zadek) Accounting, Auditing and Accountability Journal 10(3) 1997 (pp. 325–364)
- 1998: Mary Parker Follett Manuscript Award – "Highly Commended" for "Accounting and Management Research: Passwords from the gatekeepers" (with L. Parker and J. Guthrie) Accounting Auditing and Accountability Journal 11(4) 1998 (pp. 371–402)
- 1999: Anbar Citation of Excellence for "Accounting and Management Research: Passwords from the gatekeepers" (with L. Parker and J. Guthrie) Accounting Auditing and Accountability Journal
- 1999: Anbar Citation of Excellence for "Imagination, A Bowl of Petunias and Social Accounting" Critical Perspectives on Accounting 9(2) April 1998 (pp. 205–216)
- 1999: Anbar Citation of Excellence for "Seeing the wood for the trees: Taking the pulse of social and environmental accounting" (with K.J. Bebbington and D.L. Owen) Accounting Auditing and Accountability Journal 12(1) 1999 (pp. 47–51)
- 2000: Identified in P. Dobers, L. Strannegard & R. Wolff (2000) Business Strategy and the Environment 9(1) (pp. 49–61) as the most cited accounting author and the 7th most cited author in a review of environmentally-related research in management.
- 2001: Elected British Accounting Association Distinguished Academic Fellow
- 2004: Elected as one of 14 inaugural members of the British Accounting Association Hall of Fame.
