= Fixed asset register =

A fixed asset register (FAR) is a list of fixed assets that belong to an entity. Traditionally the fixed asset register was maintained in written form by a bookkeeper using a book that was set aside specifically for that purpose. Nowadays, it is more often held in electronic format in an accounting system.

The main purpose of a fixed asset register is to keep track of the book value of the assets and determine depreciation to be calculated and recorded for management and taxation purposes. A secondary purpose is to allow for the easy identification of an asset by assigning each asset a unique ID which may be printed on labels in the form of a barcode.
