= Bachelor of Accountancy =

Principal academic degree in accountancy

The Bachelor of Accountancy, also known as Bachelor of Accounting, is the principal academic degree in accountancy in several countries, and is often the only (undergraduate) degree recognised for subsequent practice as a professional accountant; see First professional degree. It is abbreviated as B.Acy., B.Acc., or B. Accty.. It is also sometimes titled Bachelor of Accounting Science (B.Acc.Sci.) or "Baccalaureus Computationis" (B.Compt.).

The B.Acy. is extremely specialized: the curriculum requires study sufficient for professional practice (often at the major-level) in financial accounting, management accounting, auditing, and taxation. The curriculum also includes intermediate coursework in business law and economics, and general coverage of management theory, and business mathematics and business statistics. The degree is thus not to be confused with a B.B.A. in Accounting or B.Com. in Accounting, which are general business degrees with accounting as an area of concentration; for discussion, see Business education § Undergraduate education. Some programs allow for specializations in topics such as Tax Accountancy, Auditing or Forensic Accountancy.

Due to the specialised nature of the B.Acy., it is a professional degree course that is offered infrequently. In the United States, it is likely to be a four-year undergraduate degree. In other parts of the world, such as Singapore, it will be a three-year undergraduate degree. In Malta, it is a two-year course that can be taken after qualifying in Bachelor of Commerce only for students who obtain exceptional grades in their previous course. Most public universities in South Africa offer the degree or a variant, often as a postgraduate Honours degree.

After completion of the Bachelor of Accountancy, students typically go on to work as accountants in industry, and/or pursue professional accountant status. When the degree is recognized for this purpose, graduates will therefore pursue the CPA or C.A. (or other) designations, and thus take up "articles" at an accounting firm accredited for training, so as to meet the relevant work experience requirements, and will then also sit the associated Professional Examination.

Note that in the United States, a bachelor's degree in accountancy is generally not sufficient for practice as a professional accountant. Also, employers in industry generally prefer to hire applicants with a master's in accountancy (or an M.B.A. with a concentration in accounting) and/or with professional certification. Accountancy graduates intending to work as accountants will therefore commence with the Master of Accountancy; an accelerated program, or an advanced program allowing for specialized / additional elective work, is typically available to these students.

== See also ==
- Master of Accountancy
- Accounting scholarship
- Accounting § Education, training and qualifications
- Bachelor of Finance
- Bachelor of Economics
- Business education § Undergraduate education
