= Accounting and the Public Interest =

Academic journal on accounting

- Discipline: Accounting
- Language: English
- Edited by: Amy M. Hageman

Publication details
- History: 2001–present
- Publisher: American Accounting Association
- Frequency: Annual

Standard abbreviations
- ISO 4: Account. Public Interest

Indexing
- ISSN: 1530-9320

Links
- Journal homepage

Accounting and the Public Interest is a refereed academic journal of accounting research, published by the Public Interest Section of the American Accounting Association. The journal focuses on public interest accounting topics, including the public interest consequences of accounting practices.

The journal was founded in 2001 and is published annually. The journal is ranked and its article citation history tracked by SCImago Journal. Research published in the journal situates accounting in an "historical, social and political context", as linked to public interest considerations.
