= Christine Cooper =

British accounting academic

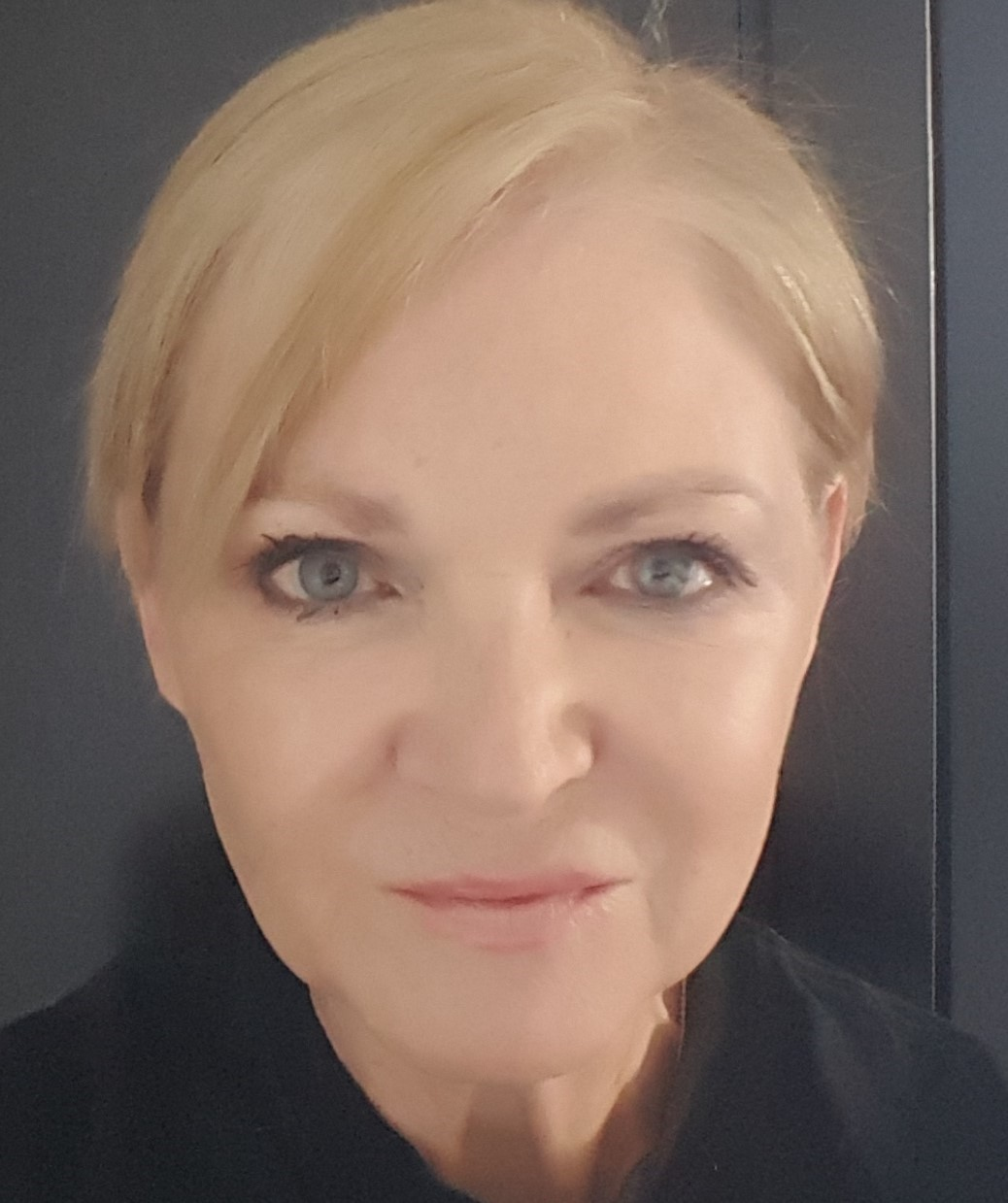
- Cooper in October 2019
- Education: University of Strathclyde
- Known for: Critical accounting research; Interpretive accounting research
- Scientific career
- Fields: Accounting
- Workplaces: Erith College of Technology (1981-1984); Ealing College of Higher Education (1984-1985); Middlesex University (1985-1988); Strathclyde Business School (1988-2018); University of Edinburgh Business School (2018-present)

Christine Cooper is a British accounting academic. She holds a Chair in Accounting at the University of Edinburgh Business School and is co-editor-in-chief of Critical Perspectives on Accounting. Her research examines the economic, political and social impact of accounting.

== Life and career ==
Cooper holds a PhD in accounting from the University of Strathclyde. She did her BA (Hons) at the University of Greenwich and her MSc in accounting and finance at the London School of Economics. During her doctoral studies, she taught at Erith College of Technology. After obtaining her PhD, with a dissertation entitled "The Impact of Accounting on Our Everyday Lives", she took a position as lecturer at Ealing College of Higher Education. A year later, she moved to Middlesex University, where she stayed for three years. In 1988, she moved to the Strathclyde Business School, where she stayed for 20 years. In 2018, she was appointed Chair in Accounting at the University of Edinburgh School of Business.

== Research ==
Cooper's research draws on Marx, Foucault, and other social theorists to examine the economic, political and social impact of accounting, particularly on our daily lives. Her published research has covered:

- Social and environmental accounting
- Accounting and gender
- Privatization
- Deskilling of accountants and bookkeepers
- Insolvency, taxation, and accountability
- Financial innovation in the charitable sector
- Neoliberal governance.

Cooper's most cited paper, "The Non and Nom of Accounting for (M)other Nature," offers a feminist critique of accounting, particularly its capacity to function as a tool for reporting on environmental performance. The article follows Hélène Cixous in adopting the word "feminine" rather than "feminist," in order to challenge what Cooper sees as the masculine symbolic structures of accounting. The article has been cited over 300 times, according to Google Scholar.

== Editorial work ==
In addition to serving as co-editor-in-chief of Critical Perspectives on Accounting, Cooper sits on the editorial boards of several peer-reviewed academic journals, including:

- Accounting, Organizations and Society
- Accounting, Auditing & Accountability Journal
- Sustainability Accounting, Management and Policy Journal
- Qualitative Research in Accounting & Management
- Accounting Forum

== Selected publications ==
The following articles have each been cited over 100 times, according to Google Scholar:

- Cooper, C. (1992). The Non and Nom of Accounting for (M)other Nature. Accounting, Auditing & Accountability Journal, 5(3).
- Cooper, C. (1995). Ideology, hegemony and accounting discourse: A case study of the National Union of Journalists. Critical Perspectives on Accounting, 6(3), 175-209.
- Cooper, C., & Taylor, P. (2000). From Taylorism to Ms Taylor: The transformation of the accounting craft. Accounting, Organizations and Society, 25(6), 555-578.
- Sikka, P., Puxty, A., Willmott, H., & Cooper, C. (1998). 'The impossibility of eliminating the expectations gap: Some theory and evidence. Critical Perspectives on Accounting, 9(3), 299-330.

== Awards ==
- Lifetime Achievement Award, British Accounting and Finance Association
- 2012 Mary Parker Follett Award, Winner, for "Vulgate accountability: Insights from the field of football" with Joanne Johnston. Accounting, Auditing & Accountability Journal, 25(4), 602-634.
