= Centre for Social and Environmental Accounting Research =

Research institute in Scotland, United Kingdom

Location	St Andrews, Scotland
Host	University of St Andrews School of Management
Field of Research	Social and Environmental Accounting
Website	CSEAR Webpage

The Centre for Social and Environmental Accounting Research (CSEAR) is a research and networking institution in the field of social accounting. It combines more than 600 active members, fellows and associates in over 30 countries.

== Purpose ==
Based at the University of St Andrews in Scotland, CSEAR's primary objective is to gather and make available information about the practice and theory of social and environmental accounting and reporting. In doing so, CSEAR's international network supports students, practitioners, scholars and educationalists in all aspects of the education, research and practice of social, environmental and sustainability accounting, reporting, auditing, finance and taxation.

== Activities ==
As a network institution, CSEAR provides a database of academics and practitioners around the world who share an interest in social and environmental accounting.

For more than ten years, CSEAR has been holding the annual International Congress on Social and Environmental Accounting (also known as CSEAR Summer School). CSEAR also regularly organises research schools and conferences in Australia, Italy, New Zealand, Spain and Portugal. The first North American Congress was held from 7–9 July 2008 at Concordia University in Montreal, Canada. A South America Congress was scheduled to be held in Brazil in 2009.

CSEAR also maintains a specialist library within the University of St Andrews Business School.

== Journal ==
The Centre publishes a biannual journal, the Social and Environmental Accounting Journal (SEAJ), which is distributed free to its members. SEAJ is a 'predominantly refereed journal committed to the creation of a new academic literature in the broad field of social, environmental and sustainable development accounting, accountability, reporting and auditing'. Next to keeping its readers informed about developments in CSEAR and relevant developments in the field and in practice, SEAJ includes extensive reviews of recent books and journal articles of relevance to researchers, practitioners and students in the field.

SEAJ is managed by an Executive Editorial Board which provides support to the editors and is underpinned by an International Editorial Advisory Board.

== History ==
Established in 1991, CSEAR has previously been hosted by the University of Dundee (1991 - 1999) and the University of Glasgow (1999 - 2004). Since 2004 CSEAR is located in, and sponsored by, the University of St Andrews' School of Management, now part of the University of St Andrews Business School. CSEAR was established by the late Professor Robert Hugh Gray and is directed by Professor John Ferguson and Dr Shona Russell.

== See also ==
- Sustainability
- Corporate Social Responsibility
