= Anthony Hopwood =

British accounting academic

- Born: 18 May 1944; Stoke-on-Trent, UK
- Died: 8 May 2010 (aged 65)
- Education: University of Chicago (MBA, PhD)
- Known for: Behavioral accounting research; Interpretive accounting research
- Spouse: Caryl Hopwood
- Scientific career
- Fields: Accounting, management
- Workplaces: Manchester Business School; London Business School; London School of Economics; Saïd Business School, Oxford University

Anthony George Hopwood was a British accounting academic at Oxford University. He was the founding editor-in-chief of Accounting, Organizations and Society and Dean of the Saïd Business School.

== Life and career ==
Hopwood was born in 1944 in Stoke-on-Trent, UK. He grew up in nearby Burslem and attended Hanley High School. He then studied accountancy at the London School of Economics. In 1965, he moved to Chicago as a Fulbright scholar to attend the Graduate School of Business at the University of Chicago. There he completed his MBA and PhD.

He was a lecturer at the Manchester Business School from 1970 to 1973. He then taught at the London Business School before moving to the London School of Economics. There he became professor of international accounting and financial management in 1985. In 1995, he moved to the Saïd Business School, University of Oxford, where he was appointed dean in 1999. He held this position until 2006. Hopwood was a Professorial Fellow at the Oxford Centre for Management Studies from 1976 to 1978, and a Fellow of Templeton College from 1995 to 1997.

Hopwood founded the journal Accounting, Organizations and Society in 1976, serving as its editor-in-chief until his retirement in 2009.

== Research ==
Hopwood's doctoral research drew on social psychology and the sociology of group dynamics to study accounting in the context of a steel mill in Gary, Indiana. His research showed that apparently technical processes, such as the setting of budgets, were complex behavioral phenomenon. He showed that decision-makers are human, with goals that may differ from those of their organization may differ.

Throughout his career, Hopwood consistently focused on the political processes and psychological factors behind accounting. He argued that accounting is not a neutral technical phenomenon, but an intensely social process that impacts society in many ways. He insisted that accounting should be studied in its social and organizational contexts.

Hopwood's research established the basic principles and methods for research into the behavioral, organizational and social aspects of accounting.

== Selected publications ==
The following publications by Hopwood have each been cited over 1000 times, according to Google Scholar:

- Burchell, S., Clubb, C., Hopwood, A., Hughes, J., & Nahapiet, J. (1980). The roles of accounting in organizations and society. Accounting, Organizations and Society, 5(1), 5-27.
- Hopwood, A. G. (1987). The archaeology of accounting systems. Accounting, Organizations and Society, 12(3), 207-234.
- Hopwood, A. G. (1983). On trying to study accounting in the contexts in which it operates. Accounting, Organizations and Society, 8(2-3), 287-305.
- Hopwood, A. G. (1972). An empirical study of the role of accounting data in performance evaluation. Journal of Accounting Research, 10:156-182.
- Hopwood, A. G. (1976). Accounting and Human Behaviour. Englewood Cliffs, NJ: Prentice-Hall.

Professor Hopwood also provided a short review on Organizational Participation: Myth and Reality, which is by Frank Heller and et al (1998).

== Awards ==
- Fulbright scholar, 1965
- Distinguished Academic of the Year, British Accounting Association, 1998
- Lifetime Achievement Awards, American Accounting Association, 2001 and 2008
- Award for Academic Leadership, European Accounting Association, 2005
- Presidential Scholar, American Accounting Association, 2006
- Accounting Hall of Fame, 2008
- Notable Contribution to the Management Accounting Literature Award, American Accounting Association, 2008
