= Accounting scholarship =

Accounting scholarship is an academic discipline oriented towards the profession of accounting, usually taught at a business school.

Since accounting is a highly technical, standards oriented profession, both practitioners and academics may claim to be experts. Accounting directly impacts many other specialties in business and is closely linked with finance. The theoretical underpinnings of both accounting and finance are derived from economics.

== Accounting academia ==
Requirements for an appointment as a professor vary considerably worldwide. Once appointed as a professor, the next step is being awarded tenure. At most institutions, this step is very competitive. Many institutions value academic credentials, professional certifications, and real world experience.

Accounting has generally been oriented towards practical knowledge as opposed to theoretical abstractions. Most students are entering the field for immediate practical knowledge. Adult learner/executive students often expect professors to have practical experience as an accountant or in commercial organizations. These students expect practical examples and an MBA case study approach to their education. By contrast, PhD students prefer research professors who themselves earned a PhD in accounting.

== Types of research ==
There are two broad types of accounting research:

- Positive accounting
- Normative accounting

== Areas of research ==
Accounting scholarship deals with the following areas:

- Accounting
- Auditing
- Taxation
- Financial management
- Professional ethics
- Corporate governance
- Controllership
- Entrepreneurship
- Experimental economics
- Agency theory

Accounting research can be tailored to a specific industry or knowledge-based, such as accounting for law firms or hotels as well as accounting for quality.

== Accounting Scholarship Rankings ==
The ability of researchers and institutions to produce quality accounting research is an important factor in many decisions made in the academic community. Such decisions may include, which program a perspective Ph.D. student should attend, where a professor should teach, and whom to collaborate with on a project. As such, many studies have been performed to rank accounting institutions and individual faculty members based on their research performance in order to provide decision makers with useful information.

Empirical studies have documented that leading accounting journals publish in total fewer research articles than comparable journals in economics and other business disciplines, and consequently, accounting scholars are relatively less successful in academic publishing than their business school peers. Due to different publication rates between accounting and other business disciplines, a recent study based on academic author rankings concludes that the competitive value of a single publication in a top-ranked journal is highest in accounting and lowest in marketing.

== Difference from scholarship in finance ==
Finance, which is another specialization of business schools, is related to accounting. However, accounting scholarship focuses more strongly on distinctive bodies of knowledge such as financial reporting, financial management, auditing, information management and taxation. Finance, on the other hand, is oriented more towards management of investments and other liquid assets.

Others differences between scholarship in finance and accounting include the number of citations articles receive, word count, and length of the publication process.

== Accounting and economics ==
The theoretical basis of the central concepts with which accounting is concerned, including profit, cost, revenue and capital is derived from economics. In turn, accounting concepts play an important role in economics, most notably in relation to national accounts.

== United Kingdom ==
In the United Kingdom, many Professors of Accounting are members of one of four registered auditors and Consultative Committee of Accountancy Bodies members including ACCA, ICAEW, ICAS and ICAI recognized under the Companies Act. Refer to the articles on Chartered accountant and Chartered Certified Accountant (ACCA) for more information about UK government policy for top MBAs in 2004. It is, however, by no means compulsory. The key criterion for being offered a professorship, or chair, is the contribution to research evaluated on the basis of published articles in scholarly journals.

== United States ==
In the United States, the minimum requirement for appointment as an instructor at an accredited university is a bachelor's degree in accounting and an additional eighteen credits of accounting post-graduate study. A post graduate degree, such as an MBA or Masters of Accountancy, is highly recommended. A Ph.D. in accounting or a related field is required for an appointment at a top tier business school, especially one in which research is undertaken.

Being licensed as a Certified Public Accountant is also strongly recommended.

The outlook for accounting programs in the United States is looking up. While the number of accounting students had dropped from its peak in 1993 and 1994 when there were 60,000 students enrolled in accounting programs, there were 37,000 undergraduate degrees awarded in 2002–2003. This represents a 6% increase from the previous year. There were also 12,655 graduate degrees awarded, a 30% increase. The causes of this increase have been ascribed to the loss of jobs in Information Technology due to the recent dot com crash, as well as the full-employment aspects of the Sarbanes-Oxley Act and the effects of all of the recent accounting scandals.
