= Social accounting and audit =

Organizational planning and measurement method

Social Accounting and audit is a comprehensive triple bottom line planning and measurement method.

Social accounting and audit uses quantitative analysis of planned and actual measurement, ratio analysis for comparing trends over time, and qualitative analysis of constant comparison using ‘coding’ and ‘categorizing’ so that responses can be made and measured.

Social accounting and audit is an internal organizational system that is managed by the organization and moderated by an external independent evaluator. The social accounting and auditing system includes the triple bottom line of:

1. Commercial and financial – quantitative measurement is by regular data entry that is compared to quarterly and annual planned targets – a planned and actual method. Financial ratios are used to compare trends over time within the organization and comparisons with sector standards.
2. Social and community – measures internal and external none commercial planned objectives and operational methods through planned and actual accounting and through qualitative questions sets.
3. Environmental and society – measure the commercial and none commercial performance of an organization's use of energy, waste and waste disposal, physical resources, and transport and communication methods.

Social accounting and audit achieves its form of measurement by using the actual values of the items and processes that are measured as the form of measurement; instead of converting social and environmental benefits and responsibility into financial values.

The financial audit provides information relevant to shareholders, while social accounting and audit provide information relevant to society.

== History ==
During the 1970 and 1980s co-operatives and social enterprises in the UK, Europe and the USA started to use the term ‘Social Audit’ as a way of describing non-financial measurement systems for commercial businesses. Social Audit Ltd, in the UK, undertook environmental assessments of companies who it considered to be high polluters. In Switzerland, the co-operative supermarket chain Migros undertook special interest audits of specific issues it felt worthy of investigation and called these Social Audits.

In America, the consultancy firm, Abt Associates, conducted a series of social audits incorporated into its annual reports. The social concerns addressed included "productivity, contribution to knowledge, employment security, fairness of employment opportunities, health, education and self-development, physical security, transportation, recreation, and environment". The social audits expressed Abt Associate's performance in these areas in financial terms and thus aspired to determine the company's net social impact in balance sheet form.

It wasn't until the late 1970s when Freer Spreckley developed an organizational Social Accounting and Audit system did Social Audit become an internal organizational system used by management of the organization to understand its commercial, social and environmental performance and influence. The social accounting and auditing system also allowed organizations to plan their social and environmental objectives with the same rigour they applied to plan their commercial objectives.

== Current practices ==
Freer Spreckley introduced the first internal system for Social Accounting and Audit in his 1981 publication: SOCIAL AUDIT - A Management Tool for Co-operative Working. Social Audit Network (SAN) is perhaps the best known organization in the UK delivering regular training and support to social enterprises and community enterprises.
