= Abraham J. Briloff =

American accounting scholar

Abraham Jacob Briloff (July 19, 1917 – December 12, 2013) was an American accounting scholar and Professor of accounting at Baruch College in New York. He was known for his contributions to accountancy, and also as the "most prominent accounting critic."

== Biography ==
Born in Manhattan to Benjamin and Anna Briloff, Briloff obtained his BA in commerce at the City College School of Business and Civic Administration, now Baruch College, in 1937. Later in 1965 he obtained his PhD in accountancy and taxation at the New York University with the thesis, entitled "The Effectiveness of Accounting Communication."

Briloff began his career in the final days of the Great Depression as high school teacher, teaching bookkeeping and stenography, and as assistant accountant in the accountancy firm of Apfel & Englander. In 1944 he became partner in that firm, and in 1951 started his own accountancy firm. In 1944 he also started lecturing accounting at the City College of New York, where he became a full-time faculty member in 1965. In 1976 he was appointed Emanuel Saxe Distinguished Professor of Accountancy. He later started writing for the Barron's Magazine, a financial weekly.

Briloff was inducted into the Accounting Hall of Fame in 2014. The induction statement read: "for over half a century, he was the conscience of the accounting profession, challenging it to raise standards and to meet its obligations to society. Always motivated by the best interests of the accounting profession, he was respected by both supporters and targets of his criticism."

== Selected publications ==
- Briloff, Abraham J. Effectiveness of Accounting Communication. (1967).
- Briloff, Abraham J. Unaccountable Accounting. Harpercollins, 1972.(Japanese edition, translated by
- Briloff, Abraham J. More Debits than Credits. Harper and Row, New York, NY (1976).Japanese edition, translated by Kumano, Imafuku, Nakano, McGrow-Hill Kogakusha, Ltd., 1980, Tokyo, Japan.
- Briloff, Abraham J. The Truth about Corporate Accounting. Harpercollins, 1981.

Articles, a selection:

- Briloff, Abraham J. "Old myths and new realities in accountancy." Accounting Review (1966): 484-495.
- Briloff, Abraham J. "Accountancy and society a covenant desecrated." Critical Perspectives on Accounting 1.1 (1990): 5-30.
- Briloff, Abraham J. "Garbage in/garbage out: A critique of fraudulent financial reporting: 1987–1997 (the COSO report) and the SEC accounting regulatory process." Critical Perspectives on Accounting 12.2 (2001): 125-148.
