= Voluntary disclosure =

Voluntary disclosure is the provision of information by a company's management beyond requirements such as generally accepted accounting principles and Securities and Exchange Commission rules, where the information is believed to be relevant to the decision-making of users of the company's annual reports.

Voluntary disclosure is carried out by many companies, although the extent and type of voluntary disclosure differs by geographic region, industry, and company size. The extent of voluntary disclosure is also affected by the firm's corporate governance structure and ownership structure; in particular, research has found that top executives have a significant influence on their firms' voluntary disclosures, and that managers have unique disclosure styles related to their personal backgrounds including their career paths and military experience.

Voluntary disclosure has also been identified as an important area in financial reporting research. There are links between firm choices to voluntarily disclose certain information and what they are required to disclose via mandatory disclosures.

== Costs and benefits ==
Voluntary disclosure benefits investors, companies and the economy; for example, it helps investors make better capital allocation decisions and lowers firms' cost of capital, the latter of which also benefits the general economy. It may also reduce conflicts of interest in widely held firms.

Voluntary disclosure is also affected by shareholder demands; for example 60 percent of the companies on the S&P 100 adopted voluntary disclosure policies in response to shareholder demand for information on corporate political spending.

Firms, however, balance the benefits of voluntary disclosure against the costs, which may include the cost of procuring the information to be disclosed, and decreased competitive advantage.

== Types and examples ==
Voluntary disclosures can include strategic information such as company characteristics and strategy, nonfinancial information such socially responsible practices, and financial information such as stock price information. The Financial Accounting Standards Board classified voluntary disclosures into the six categories below, while Meek, Roberts and Gray (1995) classified them into three major groups: strategic, nonfinancial and financial information.

Business data
For example, a breakdown of market share growth and information on new products.
Analysis of business data
For example, trend analyses and comparisons with competitors.
Forward-looking information
For example, sales forecast breakdowns and plans for expansion.
Information about management and shareholders
For example, information on stockholders and creditors, and shareholding breakdowns.
Company background
For example, product descriptions and long-term objectives.
Information about intangible assets
For example, research and development and customer relations. Intellectual Capital Disclosures are prevalent among many knowledge-based companies and are used to help stakeholders understand how an organization uses its knowledge, skills, relationships, and processes to create value.
