= University of Sydney Business School =

University education in Australia

The University of Sydney Business School
- Type: Business school
- Established: 2011
- Affiliations: University of Sydney
- Dean: Professor Leisa Sargent
- Academic staff: 500 (2021)
- Students: 15,568 (2021)
- Location: Sydney, New South Wales, Australia; 33.89197°S 151.19131°E
- Campus: Camperdown; Darlington
- Website: sydney.edu.au/business

The University of Sydney Business School is the business school and a constituent body of the University of Sydney. It was established in January 2011 and formed from the School of Business within the previous Faculty of Economics and Business. The former combined faculty itself descended from the original Faculty of Economics founded in 1920, which was the first faculty of its kind in Australia.

The School is the first in Australia to receive accreditation by the Association to Advance Collegiate Schools of Business (AACSB) and the European Quality Improvement System (EQUIS) from the European Foundation for Management Development. The School was awarded AMBA accreditation in December 2019 and thus joined the prestigious global club of Triple Accredited business schools. It is also the only Australian business school to become an associate member of the Global Alliance in Management Education (CEMS).

== History ==
Established in 1920, the Faculty of Economics initially offered the Bachelor of Economics degree which commenced in 1914. The postgraduate Master of Economics degree commenced in 1925. In 1985, the faculty introduced its second undergraduate and postgraduate degree programs, the Bachelor of Economic and Social Sciences and the Master of Economic and Social Sciences, respectively. In 1993 its third undergraduate degree program, the Bachelor of Commerce, was introduced. The Master of International Studies followed in 1994, the Master of Commerce in 1995 and the Master of International Business in 1999.

In 2005 the Business School ended its association with the jointly run Australian Graduate School of Management with The University of New South Wales. From 2006 to 2007, the University conducted a review of its social sciences faculties. As a result of that review, it was determined that parts of the School of Economics within the Faculty of Economics and Business were to be transferred to the Faculty of Arts (as it then was). In January 2008, the disciplines of Government & International Relations and Political Economy were transferred to the Faculty of Arts.

In January 2011, the Discipline of Economics, the Centre for International Security Studies and the Graduate School of Government were also transferred to the Faculty of Arts, which was renamed the Faculty of Arts and Social Sciences. Concurrently, the remaining disciplines of the Faculty of Economics and Business formed the University of Sydney Business School.

On 30 July 2009, the Business School announced the launch of the Global Executive MBA program, which was commenced in February 2010. On 30 July 2012, the Business School announced the introduction of the Sydney Master of Business Administration (MBA) program, with the program starting February 2013. Particular emphasis has been put into making positioning it as an internationally recognised degree.

In 2013, the purpose-fitted CBD campus, providing a central location for participants in the part-time MBA program, was opened. In 2016, the Abercrombie Building was opened by treasurer of New South Wales Gladys Berejiklian. In 2017, the Business School launched a new full-time MBA program for 2018 entry.

== Organisation ==
The Dean of the Sydney Business School is Professor Leisa Sargent.

Disciplines within the school include:

- Discipline of Accounting
- Discipline of Business Analytics
- Discipline of Business Information Systems
- Discipline of Business Law
- Discipline of Finance
- Discipline of International Business
- Discipline of Marketing
- Discipline of Strategy, Innovation and Entrepreneurship
- Discipline of Work and Organisational Studies

In addition to these, the school also offers postgraduate programs and research through its Centre for International Security Studies, Institute of Transport and Logistics Studies, Workplace Research Centre and Graduate School of Government.

== Rankings ==
In 2017 and 2019, the Business School’s MBA program has been ranked first in Australia by the biennial Australian Financial Review BOSS Magazine MBA Rankings . In the same rankings, the Executive MBA program has been ranked first in Australia in 2013, 2015 and 2019. In 2018, the QS World University Rankings ranked the University of Sydney in the top 20 in the world in accounting and finance and top 40 in business and management studies. The University of Sydney has been ranked first in Australia and fourth in the world for graduate employability in the 2017, 2018 and 2020 QS Graduate Employability Rankings. In 2023, the university ranked equal 19th in the world.

In 2017, The Economist and the Financial Times ranked the Business School first in Australia for Master of Management. The program was ranked 25th in the world and second in the Asia-Pacific region, and first in the world for career progress of the program’s graduate, by the Financial Times. The Economist also ranked the program 3rd in the Asia-Pacific region, and 35th in the world. The CEMS Master’s in International Management program, the only Australian CEMS member, was ranked 9th in the world in 2017 by the Financial Times.

== Professional accreditation ==
Studies in accounting are recognised by CPA Australia and the Chartered Accountants Australia and New Zealand (CAANZ).

Majors in Industrial Relations and Human Resource Management are accredited by the Australian Human Resource Institute (AHRI).

An extended major in Business Information Systems are accredited by the Australian Computer Society(ACS).

The Master of Marketing program is accredited by the Australian Marketing Institute (AMI).

Bachelor of Commerce (Finance major) is recognised as a program partner with CFA Institute.

== Faculty journals ==
- Abacus
- Accounting, Auditing & Accountability Journal
- Australian Accounting Review
- Australian Review of Public Affairs
- Australian Tax Forum
- International Journal of Development Issues
- International Journal of Forecasting
- International Journal of Information Management
- International Journal of Management Reviews
- Journal of Australian Political Economy
- Journal of Industrial Relations
- Journal of International Financial Management & Accounting
- Labour History

== Alumni ==
Notable alumni of the Sydney Business School or its predecessor faculties include:

- Glenn Stevens, BEc (Hons) 1979, Governor of the Reserve Bank of Australia (2006—2016)
- Tony Abbott, BEc 1979 (Syd), LLB 1981 (Syd), MA 1982 (Oxford), former Prime Minister of Australia
- Anthony Albanese, BEc 1984, Prime Minister of Australia since 2022
- Chris Bowen, BEc, former Treasurer of Australia (2013)
- Roger Davis, BEc, Chairman of Bank of Queensland
- Nick Greiner, BEc (Hons), former premier of New South Wales (1988–1992)
- Morris Iemma, BEc, former premier of New South Wales (2005–2008)
- Justice Michael Kirby, BEc, Justice of the High Court of Australia (1996–2009)
- Mark Latham, BEc, opposition leader of Australia (2003–2005)
