= Prem Sikka, Baron Sikka =

British accounting academic (born 1951)

The Right Honourable The Lord Sikka
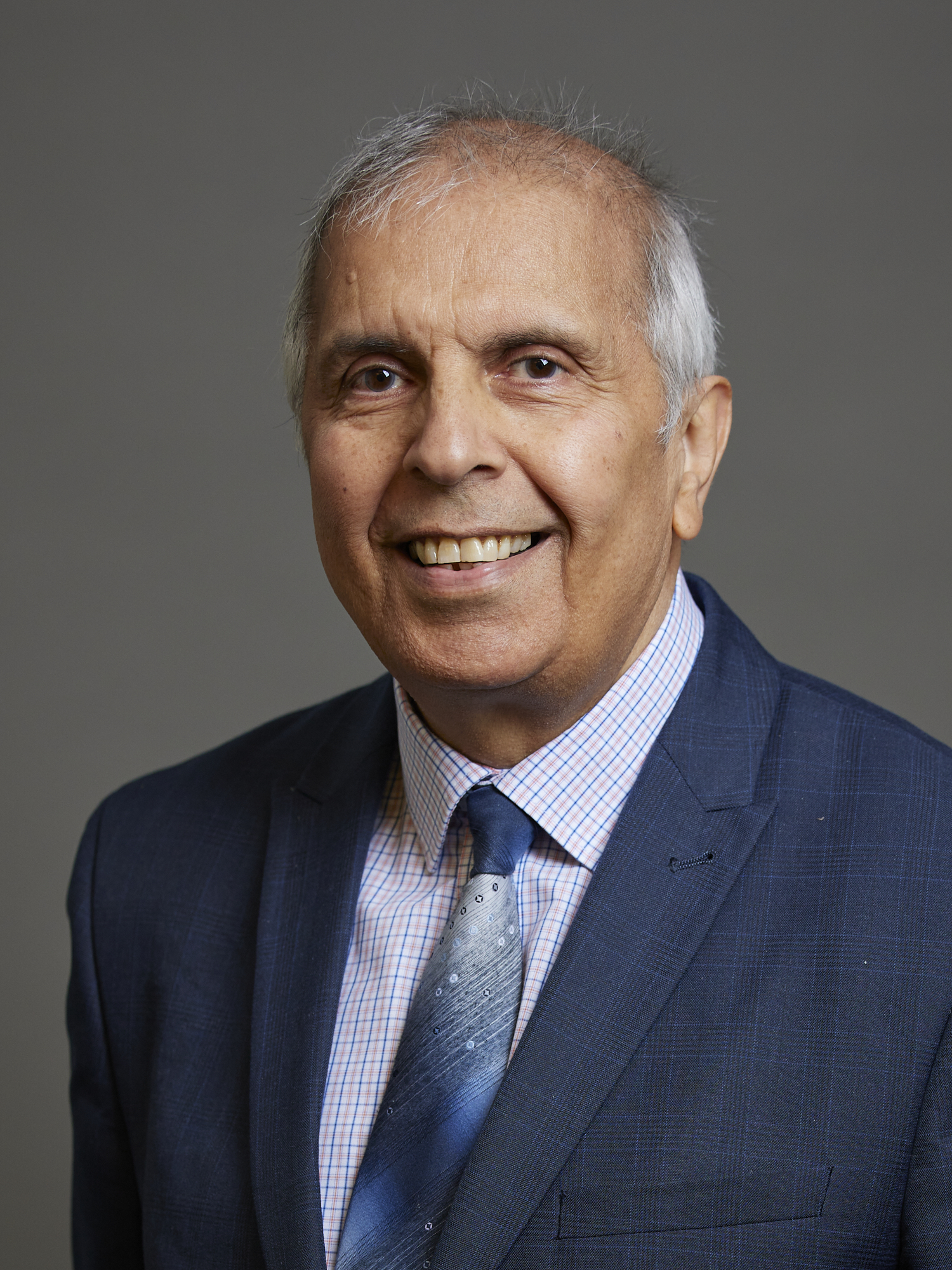
- Official portrait, 2022
- Born: 1 August 1951 (age 75)
- Education: London School of Economics; University of Sheffield; Open University
- Known for: Critical accounting research; Auditing research
- Political party: Labour Party
- Scientific career
- Fields: Accounting
- Workplaces: University of East London; University of Essex; University of Sheffield

Member of the House of Lords
- Lord Temporal
- Life peerage 10 September 2020

Personal details
- Party: Labour

Prem Nath Sikka, Baron Sikka (born 1 August 1951) is a British-Indian accountant, academic and life peer. He holds the position of Professor of Accounting at the University of Sheffield, and is Emeritus Professor of Accounting at the University of Essex.

== Early life and education ==
Sikka was born on 1 August 1951. He migrated to the UK from India with his family in 1966. He has said of his parents that they "were working-class people – and work killed them in the end": his mother died at the age of 53 and his father, a Labour Party activist, died at 59. He left school two years later with five passes at Certificate of Secondary Education (CSE) level. He then became an accounts clerk with an insurance broker in London. He pursued his education via part-time evening classes, gaining five O-levels and two A-levels, before qualifying as a Chartered Certified Accountant from the Association of Chartered Certified Accountants in 1977.

Having studied accounting and finance part-time at the London School of Economics, he graduated in 1982 with a Master of Science (MSc) degree. In 1991, he completed a Doctor of Philosophy (PhD) degree in accounting from the University of Sheffield; his doctoral thesis was titled "Towards an understanding of accounting and society: some episodes in the formulation and development of the going concern concept". In 1995, he also earned a first class honours Bachelor of Arts (BA) degree in social sciences from the Open University.

== Career ==
Sikka worked in corporate accountancy during the 1970s, before joining North East London Polytechnic as a lecturer in 1979, where he progressed to become a senior lecturer the following year, a principal lecturer in 1986, a reader in 1993, and appointed Professor of Accounting and Finance in 1995. He left the institution (now the University of East London) in 1996. In 1996, Sikka joined the University of Essex as Professor of Accounting, where he now holds the position of emeritus professor. In 2017, he joined the University of Sheffield as Professor of Accounting.

Sikka is a co-founder of the Tax Justice Network, and has served as a Senior Adviser to it since its establishment in 2002. Through this he became involved in politics, briefing the Socialist Campaign Group before becoming involved in policy development for Jeremy Corbyn and John McDonnell during their time as Labour Party leader and Shadow Chancellor of the Exchequer respectively, working on issues related to tax, corporate governance and executive pay.

Sikka has called for banning MPs from having second jobs, referring to them as "institutionalised bribery".

=== House of Lords ===
In the 2020, Sikka was nominated for a life peerage by Jeremy Corbyn in his role as leader of the Labour Party. He was created Baron Sikka, of Kingswood in Basildon in the County of Essex on 10 September 2020. He sits in the House of Lords as a Labour Party peer. On 27 October 2020, he made his maiden speech during a debate on the "Town and Country Planning (General Permitted Development) (England) (Amendment) (No. 2) Order 2020".

== Criticism of the accounting profession ==
Sikka is an outspoken critic of the accounting profession, particularly with regard to its roles in auditing public corporations and helping transnational corporations avoid taxes. He has written about auditing failures, corporate governance issues, money laundering, insolvency and tax avoidance for The Guardian since 1990. He has also written for The Independent and HuffPost.

Sikka's research has been described as being about the "dark side of capitalism". In May 2017 Sikka featured in the documentary The Spider's Web: Britain's Second Empire on the UK's relationships with tax havens.

Sikka's active use of the media as an academic to criticise the accounting profession has itself been the subject of academic research.

== Personal life ==
He describes his hobbies as "travel, movies, table tennis, badminton, music, Bollywood (1960s and 1970s), supporting West Ham, afflicting the comfortable and tormenting dinosaurs".

== Selected publications ==
Sikka's academic research has examined problems in auditing, tax avoidance, corporate social responsibility, and corporate governance. According to Google Scholar, the following academic publications by Sikka have been cited over 100 times as of January 2019:

- Sikka, P. (2009) Financial crisis and the silence of the auditors. Accounting, Organizations and Society, 34 (6-7), 868–873.
- Sikka, P., & Willmott, H. (1995). The power of independence: defending and extending the jurisdiction of accounting in the UK. Accounting, Organizations and Society, 20(6), 547–581.
- Sikka, P., Puxty, A., Willmott, H., & Cooper, C. (1998). The impossibility of eliminating the expectations gap: some theory and evidence. Critical Perspectives on Accounting, 9(3), 299–330.
- Sikka, P., & Willmott, H. (2010). The dark side of transfer pricing: Its role in tax avoidance and wealth retentiveness. Critical Perspectives on Accounting, 21(4), 342–356.
- Arnold, P. J., & Sikka, P. (2001). Globalization and the state–profession relationship: the case the Bank of Credit and Commerce International. Accounting, Organizations and Society, 26(6), 475–499.
- Sikka, P. (2010, September). Smoke and mirrors: Corporate social responsibility and tax avoidance. Accounting Forum, 34(3-4), 153–168.
- Sikka, P., Willmott, H., & Lowe, T. (1989). Guardians of Knowledge and Public Interest: Evidence and Issues of Accountability in the UK Accountancy Profession. Accounting, Auditing & Accountability Journal, 2(2).
- Hammond, T., & Sikka, P. (1996). Radicalizing accounting history: the potential of oral history. Accounting, Auditing & Accountability Journal, 9(3), 79–97.
- Sikka, P. (2008). Enterprise culture and accountancy firms: new masters of the universe. Accounting, Auditing & Accountability Journal, 21(2), 268–295.
- Mitchell, A., Puxty, T., Sikka, P., & Willmott, H. (1994). Ethical statements as smokescreens for sectional interests: The case of the UK accountancy profession. Journal of Business Ethics, 13(1), 39–51.
- Mitchell, A., Sikka, P., & Willmott, H. (1998). Sweeping it under the carpet: The role of accountancy firms in moneylaundering. Accounting, Organizations and Society, 23(5-6), 589–607.
- Sikka, P., & Willmott, H. (1995). Illuminating the state-profession relationship: accountants acting as department of trade and industry investigators. Critical Perspectives on Accounting, 6(4), 341–369.
- Mitchell, A., & Sikka, P. (1993). Accounting for change: The institutions of accountancy. Critical Perspectives on Accounting, 4(1), 29–52.
- Sikka, P., Willmott, H., & Puxty, T. (1995). The mountains are still there: Accounting academics and the bearings of intellectuals. Accounting, Auditing & Accountability Journal, 8(3), 113–140.
- Sikka, P., & Hampton, M. P. (2005). The role of accountancy firms in tax avoidance: Some evidence and issues. Accounting Forum, 29(3), 325–343.

Orders of precedence in the United Kingdom
| Preceded by The Lord Botham | Gentlemen; Baron Sikka | Followed by The Lord Sedwill |
