= Accounting entity =

An Accounting Entity is simply an Entity for which accounting records are to be kept.

The main requirements for something to be considered an "accounting entity" are:

- It can own property the value of which can be measured in financial terms
- It can incur debts or liabilities which can also be measured in financial terms
- It can therefore be assigned a value for its net worth or solvency which is the difference between the two

Examples of accounting entities include corporations, clubs, trusts, partnerships and individuals.
