= Positive accounting =

Branch of accounting research

Positive accounting is the branch of academic accounting research that seeks to explain and predict actual accounting practices. This contrasts with normative accounting, that seeks to derive and prescribe "optimal" accounting standards.

== Background ==
Positive accounting emerged with empirical studies that proliferated in accounting in the late 1960s. It was organized as an academic school of thought of discipline by the work of Ross Watts and Jerold Zimmerman (in 1978 and 1986) at the William E. Simon School of Business Administration at the University of Rochester, and by the founding of the Journal of Accounting and Economics in 1979. When published, the pioneering articles were greeted with considerable criticism.

== Views ==
Positive accounting can be associated with the contractual view of the firm. The firm is viewed as “a nexus of contracts” and accounting one tool to facilitate the formation and performance of contracts. Under this view, accounting practices evolve to mitigate contracting costs by establishing ex ante agreement among varying parties. For example, positive accounting postulates that conservatism in accounting –in this sense defined conditionally as requiring lower (higher) standards of verifiability to recognize losses (gains)– has origins in contract markets, including managerial compensation contracts and lender debt contracts. As an example, absent conservatism, managerial compensation agreements may reward managers based on current reports that later evidence indicates were unwarranted.

The contractual view of positive accounting puts it in tension with value relevance studies in accounting: the latter contend that accounting’s primary role is to value the firm, and thus practices like conservatism are sub-optimal. The value relevance school emphasizes the usefulness of accounting information to equity investors in contrast to its usefulness in contracting exercises.

== Efficiency perspective ==
The efficiency perspective is taken into Positive Accounting theory as researchers explain how various managers choose accounting methods that show a true representation of the firm's performance. Within this perspective, it is stated by numerous authors that accounting practices adopted by firms are often explained on the basis showing the true image of financial performance of the firm.

== Opportunistic perspective ==
The opportunistic perspective holds the view that managers, who are agents to the principal, act to their self-interests. They only adopt accounting policies that allow them to gain, in the view that the firm also gains. Different types of hypotheses exist such as political cost, bonus plan and debt hypothesis that show what motives make the managers choose one accounting method over another.

=== Management compensation hypothesis (Bonus plan hypothesis) ===
The management compensation hypothesis states that managers who have accounting incentives, or remuneration that is tied up with the firm's accounting performance, will tend to manipulate accounting method and figures to show the accounting performance better than it should be. For example, such managers may elect to use different depreciation method allowing lower profits at the start and higher profits towards the end. Older managers will tend to ignore any research and development costs because it will lower current year profits affecting their income.

=== Debt-equity hypothesis ===
The debt/equity hypothesis states that managers will tend to show better profits (similar to the bonus plan/management compensation hypothesis) with the intention of having a better performance and liquidity position to pay the interest and principal of the debt they have accumulated in the business. The higher the debt/equity level the more likely it is that the managers will tend to use accounting methods and procedures in increasing accounting profit.

=== Political cost hypothesis ===
The political cost hypothesis asserts that firms will employ various accounting methods to show lower profits so as not to attract the attention of politicians, who have an eye on high-profit industries and will place higher regulation on high-earning firms.

== Criticisms ==
1. It does not provide any prescription, it does not state what ought to happen, rather explains and predicts what would happen, which is the aim of positive accounting theory and this is insufficient
2. It is not value-free because it only explains and predicts what people might do, ignoring altogether on what they should do.
3. It assumes that every manager's (agent) and owner's (principal) actions have a self-interest motive, with the primary goal of maximizing their own wealth without considering any adverse effects.
4. It is impossible to avoid value judgments in the choice of research topics and the design of research studies.

== See also ==
- Accounting research
