= Parkland Institute =

The Parkland Institute
- Formation: 1996
- Type: Public policy think tank
- Location: Edmonton, Alberta
- Website: www.parklandinstitute.ca

The Parkland Institute is an Alberta-wide, non-partisan research institute, situated within the Faculty of Arts at the University of Alberta. The Institute studies economic, social, cultural, and political issues using the intellectual approach of Canadian political economy.

The Institute was founded in the fall of 1996, and first came to public attention in February 1997 when it co-published with the University of Alberta Press the book Shredding the Public Interest: Ralph Klein and 25 Years of One-Party Government by researcher Kevin Taft. Then-Alberta premier Ralph Klein accused Taft of promoting "communism" and the book quickly became a best-seller.

In addition to publishing and disseminating the findings of research, the Parkland Institute has hosted an annual conference each November at the University of Alberta since 1997.

== History ==
The Parkland Institute was founded in 1996 by Gordon Laxer, a political economist in the University of Alberta's sociology department, who became the Institute's first director.

The Institute's first publication, Shredding the Public Interest: Ralph Klein and 25 Years of One-Party Government by researcher Kevin Taft became a best-seller after then-premier Ralph Klein criticized the report and accused Taft of being a communist.

In November 1997, the Institute held its first annual conference, "Globalization, Corporatism & Democracy: Alberta and Canada," which featured a keynote presentation by John Ralston Saul.

In March 1999, Ralph Klein again attacked the Institute, sending a letter of complaint about a conference presentation by economist Armine Yalnizyan to then University of Alberta President Rod Fraser, in which he accused the Institute of being "factually challenged" and "one-sided and ideologically biased."

Bill Moore-Kilgannon was the Institute's Executive Director for the first four years, and was replaced by current Executive Director Ricardo Acuña in May 2002.

In January 2012, Gordon Laxer stepped down as Director, and was replaced by University of Lethbridge sociologist Trevor Harrison.

== Research and publications ==
The Institute "studies economic, social, cultural and political issues using the perspective of Canadian political economy," and focuses its research in the areas of taxation and finance in Alberta, energy policy, poverty and social inequality, democracy and governance, labour markers, education, and health care. All of the Institute's research is peer reviewed prior to publication.

The most common research formats for the Parkland Institute are reports and fact sheets; the Institute has published over 80 since 1999. The Institute also published or co-published six books between 1999 and 2006. Two of the Institute's books, Shredding the Public Interest: Ralph Klein and 25 Years of One-Party Government and Clear Answers: The Economics and Politics of For-Profit Medicine were best-sellers.

The Institute published a regular newsletter, The Parkland Post, but suspended publication in fall 2013.

== Annual Conference ==
Starting in 1997, the Institute has held its annual fall conference each November on the University of Alberta campus.

Past conference keynote speakers have included John Ralston Saul, Vandana Shiva, Helen Caldicott, Michael Parenti, Linda McQuaig, Maude Barlow, Margaret Atwood, Ronald Wright, Chris Hedges, and Guy Standing.
