= Accounting, Organizations and Society =

- Discipline: Accounting
- Language: English
- Edited by: Marcia Annisette, Martin Messner, Hun-Tong Tan

Publication details
- History: 1975–present
- Publisher: Elsevier
- Frequency: 8/year
- Impact factor: 4.000 (2020)

Standard abbreviations
- ISO 4: Account. Organ. Soc.

Indexing
- ISSN: 0361-3682
- LCCN: 81642472
- OCLC no.: 716356215

Links
- Journal homepage; Online archive

Accounting, Organizations and Society is a peer-reviewed academic journal published by Elsevier. Its editors-in-chief are Marcia Annisette (Schulich School of Business), Martin Messner (University of Innsbruck), and Hun-Tong Tan (Nanyang Technological University). The journal focuses on the relationships between accounting and both human behaviour and organizations' structures, processes, social, and political environments: that is, relationships among accounting, organizations, and society.

== History ==
The journal was established in 1975 at Pergamon Press by the late Anthony Hopwood, who subsequently took an active role as editor through promoting conferences and releasing editorial statements that helped to identify emerging areas of accounting research. Hopwood and colleagues defined the programmatic aims of the journal in its early years. Following Hopwood's retirement at the end of 2009, Christopher Chapman was appointed editor-in-chief, serving from the beginning of 2010 until 2015, when Keith Robson took on the role. Robson served as sole editor-in-chief until the appointment of Peecher and Annisette as co-editors-in-chief in September 2018.

== Reception ==
The journal is reputed to publish high quality and innovative research work. According to the Journal Citation Reports, the journal has a 2017 impact factor of 2.077. It is among the 50 journals used to compile the "Financial Times Research Rank". It is also included in the highest rank of academic journals by the Australian Business Deans Council. According to a 2006 meta-analysis of studies of accounting journals, the journal was at the time one of the five accounting journals to be consistently ranked as top accounting journals.

According to Google Scholar, the most cited articles are:

- Hood, Christopher (1995). "The "New Public Management' in the 1980s: variations on a theme". Accounting, Organizations and Society. 20 (2–3): 93–109. doi:10.1016/0361-3682(93)E0001-W.
- Chenhall, Robert (2003). "Management control systems design within its organizational context: findings from contingency-based research and directions for the future". Accounting, Organizations and Society. 28 (2–3): 127–168. doi:10.1016/S0361-3682(01)00027-7.
- Roberts, Robin (1992). "Determinants of corporate social responsibility disclosure: an application of stakeholder theory". Accounting, Organizations and Society. 17 (6): 595–612. doi:10.1016/0361-3682(92)90015-K.
- Burchell, Stuart; Clubb, Colin; Hopwood, Anthony; Hughes, John; Nahapiet, Janine (1980). "The roles of accounting in organizations and society". Accounting, Organizations and Society. 5 (1): 5–27. doi:10.1016/0361-3682(80)90017-3.
- Neu, Dean; Warsame, Hussein; Pedwell, Kathryn (1998). "Managing public impressions: environmental disclosures in annual reports". Accounting, Organizations and Society. 23 (3): 265–282. doi:10.1016/S0361-3682(97)00008-1.

== Abstracting and indexing ==
The journal is abstracted and indexed in Current Contents/Social & Behavioral Sciences, RePEc, and the Social Sciences Citation Index. According to the Journal Citation Reports, the journal has a 2020 impact factor of 4.000, ranking it 19th out of 108 in the category of Finance.

== See also ==
- Accounting research
- Accounting, Auditing & Accountability Journal
- The Accounting Review
- Critical Perspectives on Accounting
- Journal of Accounting and Economics
- Journal of Accounting Research
