= Advances in Public Interest Accounting =

Academic journal of accounting

- Edited by: Jorge Romero
- Discipline: Accounting
- Publisher: Emerald Group Publishing
- Website: books.emeraldinsight.com/page/series-detail/advances-in-public-interest-accounting/

Advances in Public Interest Accounting (ISSN 1041-7060) is a book series on accounting, published regularly since 1986. The series is edited by Jorge Romero and published by Emerald Group Publishing.

The publication is abstracted and indexed in Scopus, Web of Science and Australian Business Deans Council.
