= Critical Perspectives on Accounting =

- Discipline: Accounting
- Language: English
- Edited by: Jane Andrew, Christine Cooper, Yves Gendron

Publication details
- History: 1990–present
- Publisher: Elsevier
- Frequency: 8/year
- Impact factor: 5.538 (2021)

Standard abbreviations
- ISO 4: Crit. Perspect. Account.

Indexing
- ISSN: 1045-2354
- LCCN: 90649324
- OCLC no.: 884166574

Links
- Journal homepage; Online access; Online archive

Critical Perspectives on Accounting is a peer-reviewed academic journal published by Elsevier. The aim of the journal is to study how accounting works within society and to promote forms of accounting that are in the public interest. It was established in 1990 with David J. Cooper (University of Alberta), and A.M. Tinker (Baruch College) as founding editors-in-chief. They were succeeded in 2008 by Marcia Annisette, Christine Cooper, and Dean Neu. The current editors-in-chief are Jane Andrew (University of Sydney Business School), Helen Tregidga (Royal Holloway University of London), and Jérémy Morales (University of Bristol).

== Abstracting and indexing ==
The journal is abstracted and indexed in the Accountants Index, Current Contents/Social & Behavioral Sciences, EBSCO databases, International Bibliography of the Social Sciences, ProQuest databases, RePEc, Scopus, and Social Sciences Citation Index. According to the Journal Citation Reports, the journal has a 2021 impact factor of 5.538.

== #ULSB16 controversy ==
In January 2021, sixteen academics were targeted for redundancy by the University of Leicester School of Business because they had published articles in Critical Perspectives on Accounting. Publishing in this journal was treated as evidence of unsuitable scholarship, hence a basis for redundancy. The University of Leicester aimed to shed critical management scholarship as part of a strategic reorientation of the School towards a more mainstream outlook. The sixteen faculty members were being targeted because of their engagement in critical scholarship areas deemed not sufficiently congenial with the new vision of the School. The Head of the College of Social Sciences, Arts and Humanities (a sociologist) stated that management research should not be informed by a sociological perspective.

== Notable articles ==
According to Google Scholar, the most heavily cited articles are:

1. Brown, Judy; Dillard, Jesse (2013). "Agonizing over engagement: SEA and the 'death of environmentalism' debates". Critical Perspectives on Accounting. 24 (1): 1–18. doi:10.1016/j.cpa.2012.09.001.
2. Abeysekera, Indra; Guthrie, James (2005). "An empirical investigation of annual reporting trends of intellectual capital in Sri Lanka". Critical Perspectives on Accounting. 16 (3): 151–163. doi:10.1016/S1045-2354(03)00059-5.
3. Bebbington, Jan; Gray, Rob (2001). "An account of sustainability: failure, success and a reconceptualization". Critical Perspectives on Accounting. 12 (5): 557–588. doi:10.1006/cpac.2000.0450.
4. Rezaee, Zabihollah (2005). "Causes, Consequences, and deterrance [sic?] of financial statement fraud". Critical Perspectives on Accounting. 16 (3): 277–298. doi:10.1016/S1045-2354(03)00072-8.
5. Rahaman, Abu Shiraz; Lawrence, Stuart; Roper, Juliet (2004). "Social and environmental reporting at the VRa: institutionalised legitimacy or legitimation crisis". Critical Perspectives on Accounting. 15 (1): 35–56. doi:10.1016/S1045-2354(03)00005-4.
