= Accounting research =

Accounting research examines how accounting is used by individuals, organizations and government as well as the consequences that these practices have. Starting from the assumption that accounting both measures and makes visible certain economic events, accounting research has studied the roles of accounting in organizations and society and the consequences that these practices have for individuals, organizations, governments and capital markets. It encompasses a broad range of topics including financial accounting research, management accounting research, auditing research, capital market research, accountability research, social responsibility research and taxation research.

Academic accounting research "addresses all aspects of the accounting profession" using the scientific method, while research by practicing accountants focuses on solving problems for a client or group of clients. Academic accounting research can make significant contribution to accounting practice, although changes in accounting education and the accounting academia in recent decades have led to a divide between academia and practice in accounting.

== Overview ==
"Accounting has been a craft that has had no essence. It has changed significantly across time, adopting new forms, methods, and roles. Likewise for accounting research. [...] Indeed the very role of accounting research is in part to make both accounting and our knowledge of it different, to move forward our understandings of accounting and, at times, the practice of accounting itself. "

—Anthony Hopwood, in his address to the 2006 American Accounting Association annual meeting

Accounting research is carried out both by academic researchers and by practicing accountants. Academic accounting research addresses all areas of the accounting profession, and examines issues using the scientific method; it uses evidence from a wide variety of sources, including financial information, experiments, computer simulations, interviews, surveys, historical records, and ethnography.

Research by practicing accountants "focuses on solving immediate problems for a single client or small group of clients" and involve, for example, decision-making on the implementation of new accounting or auditing standards, the presentation of unusual transactions in the financial statements, and the impact of new tax laws on clients.

Accounting research is also carried out by accounting organizations such as standard-setting bodies. For example, the International Accounting Standards Board (IASB) may initiate research projects for certain issues, the results of these may inform its decision whether to move the issues to its active agenda.

=== History of accounting research ===
Accounting research has undergone some significant changes in the past decades. In the 1950s, an accounting academia was established that adopted the requirements of social science academia, such as PhD qualifications and research papers. The mid-1970s saw a shift from the dominance of normative research to:

- positive research "that uses methods from finance and economics",
- behavioral research drawing on psychology,
- interdisciplinary research that has adapted methods from a wide variety of social sciences,
- public interest accounting research that examines the public interest consequences of different accounting practices, and
- critical research using Marxian and other critical theory perspectives.

== Academic research and accounting practice ==
=== Contribution of academic research to practice ===
The contribution of academic accounting research to accounting practice includes the assessment of current accounting practices, the development of new practices, and the development of university curricula:

"Academic research has an important role to play, both in assessing the extent to which existing practices are 'fit for purpose' and in developing new practices to address changing business, economic and societal needs. Research also informs the teaching curricula in universities, thus affecting the range of issues of which future generations will become aware and consider important."

For example, academic accounting research "can improve the understanding of how stakeholders actually use the information accountants provide", and prior academic studies have contributed to fraud risk assessment, the future direction of the profession, and the impact of changing accounting standards.

=== Gap between academia and practice ===
Several publications, including the recent accounting literature, have suggested a divide or gap between the academic and professional communities in accounting. Aspects of the divide have been suggested to include criticisms of academics for speaking with their own jargon and aiming to publish research rather than improve practice, and criticisms of practicing accountants for being resistant to changes to the status quo and reluctant to disclose data.

The divide between accounting academia and practice was originally centered on whether a broader education or just technical training was the best way to educate accountants. From the 1950s, accounting academia and practice grew further divided due to the accounting academic community adopting requirements from social science academia, while practicing accountants "maintained an emphasis on professional qualifications and technical skills".

Aside from accounting academia and practice valuing different skills and requirements, a variety of factors have been proposed for the divide. One view is that a lack of training in reading academic research may lead practicing accountants "to dismiss what could be very helpful information as either too complicated or too disconnected to be useful"; while another view points to fundamental failures in academic research in business and economics in general—for example that researchers have failed to effectively question prevailing economic and business models.

== Types of academic accounting research ==
Academic accounting research addresses a range of broad topical areas within accounting, using a wide variety of methodologies and theories. The following classifications highlight several important types of accounting research. They are by no means exhaustive, and many academic accounting studies resist simple classification.

=== Topical areas ===
Financial accounting research
Examines financial accounting and the financial markets, and focuses on the relationship between accounting information and the decision-making of external users of the accounting information in the capital markets.
Managerial accounting research
Focuses on management accounting and the relationship between management accounting information and its internal users, for example examining the allocation of resources and decision-making within an enterprise.
Auditing research
Studies related to the audit function, including auditor decision-making and the effects of auditing on financial reporting.
Taxation research
Examines taxation-related issues such as market reactions to tax disclosures and taxpayer decision-making, and the relationship between accounting information and tax authorities.
Governance research
Examines the overall corporate management of organizations.
Accounting information systems (AIS) research
Examines issues related to accounting information systems, such as system security and design science.

Accounting education research

Focuses on the development of relevant curriculum, decision making, and applied research at the undergraduate and graduate levels.

=== Methodologies ===
Archival research
Research that examines "objective data collected from repositories", including data collected by the researchers.
Experimental research
Research that examines data "the researcher gathered by administering treatments to subjects".
Analytical research
Research "based on the act of formally modeling theories or substantiating ideas in mathematical terms".
Interpretive research
Research that emphasizes the role of language, interpretation and understanding in accounting practice, "highlighting the symbolic structures and taken-for-granted themes which pattern the world in distinct ways."
Critical research
Research that emphasizes the role of power and conflict in accounting practice.

Other possible methodologies include the use of case studies, computer simulations and field research.

=== Theories ===
Agency theory
Research that seeks to explain and predict accounting practices related to the principal-agent relationship between shareholders and managers, including issues related to information asymmetry and moral hazard.
Institutional theory
Research that focuses socially-generated rules that structure accounting practices in organizations and society.
Structuration theory
Research that draws on the structuration theory of Anthony Giddens, and that seeks to explain accounting practices as an interaction between an individual's capability to make choices and the social rules and structures that constrain individual choices, and which are reproduced through individual behavior.
Foucauldian theory
Research influenced by Michel Foucault that sees accounting practices as dependent on historical circumstances, and as tools for disciplining individual behavior.
Latourian theory
Research influenced by Bruno Latour that is "concerned with understanding accounting technologies in the context of networks of human and non-human 'actants'."
Linguistic theory
Research that sees accounting as a discursive practice, and which draws on linguistic theory and hermeneutics.

== See also ==
- Accounting scholarship
- Positive accounting
- Public interest accounting
