= Accounting, Auditing & Accountability Journal =

- Discipline: Accountancy
- Language: English
- Edited by: James Guthrie, Lee D. Parker

Publication details
- History: 1988–present
- Publisher: Emerald Group Publishing
- Frequency: 8/year
- Open access: Hybrid
- Impact factor: 4.88 (2021)

Standard abbreviations
- ISO 4: Account. Audit. Account. J.

Indexing
- ISSN: 0951-3574
- LCCN: sn91022763
- OCLC no.: 499757338

Links
- Journal homepage; Online archive

The Accounting, Auditing & Accountability Journal is a peer-reviewed academic journal covering accounting theory and practice. The journal was established in 1988 and is published by Emerald Group Publishing.

In 2022 the editors-in-chief are James Guthrie (Macquarie University) and Lee D. Parker (Glasgow University and RMIT University. The journal publishes papers on "the interaction between accounting and auditing on the one hand and their institutional, socio-economic, political, and historical environment on the other", as well as poetry and short prose from accounting and management academics. The journal sponsors the Asia-Pacific Interdisciplinary Research Conference in Accounting, which is held every three years.

== Abstracting and indexing ==
The journal is abstracted and indexed in:

- Current Contents/Social & Behavioral Sciences
- EBSCO databases
- International Bibliography of the Social Sciences
- ProQuest databases
- Scopus
- Social Sciences Citation Index

According to the Journal Citation Reports, the journal has a 2020 impact factor of 4.117.

== Notable articles ==
According to Google Scholar, the most cited articles are:

1. Gray, Rob; Kouhy, Reza; Lavers, Simon (1995). "Corporate social and environmental reporting: a review of the literature and longitudinal study". Accounting, Auditing & Accountability Journal. 8 (2): 47–77. doi:10.1108/09513579510146996.
2. Deegan, Craig (2002). "Introduction: the legitimising effect of social and environmental disclosures--a theoretical foundation". Accounting, Auditing & Accountability Journal. 15 (3): 282–311. doi:10.1108/09513570210435852.
3. Hackston, David; Milne, Markus (1996). "Some Deteriminants of social and environmental disclosures in New Zealand companies". Accounting, Auditing & Accountability Journal. 9 (1): 77–108. doi:10.1108/09513579610109987.
4. O'Donovan, George (2002). "Environmental disclosures in the annual report: extending the applicability and predictive power of legitimacy theory". Accounting, Auditing & Accountability Journal. 15 (3): 344–371. doi:10.1108/09513570210435870.
5. Deegan, Craig; Ranking, Michael (1996). "Do Australian companies report environmental news objectively? An analysis of environmental disclosures by firms prosecuted successfully by the Environmental Protection Authority". Accounting, Auditing & Accountability Journal. 9 (2): 50–67. doi:10.1108/09513579610116358.
