= ASK Group =

American manufacturing software

Facsimile of the logo which was used from 1986-1991

ASK Group, Inc., formerly ASK Computer Systems, Inc., was a producer of business and manufacturing software. It is best remembered for its MANMAN enterprise resource planning (ERP) software and for Sandra Kurtzig, the company's founder and one of the early female pioneers in the computer industry. At its peak, ASK had 91 offices in 15 countries and was one of the 10 largest software companies in the world. Computer Associates acquired the company in 1994.

== Beginning and growth (1972–1982) ==
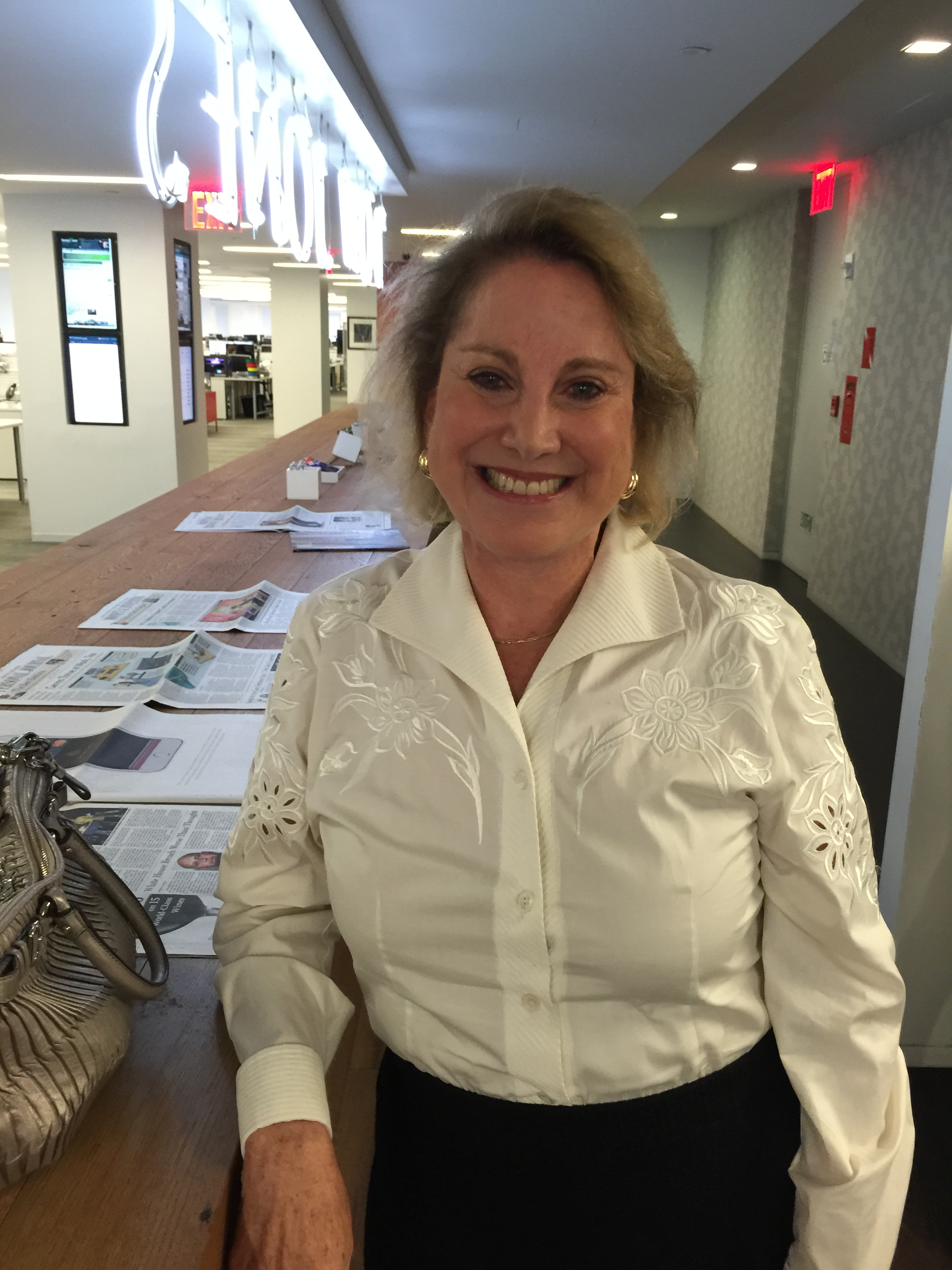
Sandra Kurtzig founder of ASK (pictured in 2014)

ASK was started in 1972 by Sandra Kurtzig in California, United States. ASK was named "standing for Arie and Sandra Kurtzig", although Arie Kurtzig was never closely involved with the company. She left her job as a marketing specialist at General Electric and invested $2,000 of her savings to start the company.

ASK was incorporated in 1974.

In 1976, Kurtzig came up with ASK's most significant product, named MANMAN (originally "MaMa"), a contraction of manufacturing management. It was a manufacturing resource planning (MRP) system that ran on Hewlett-Packard minicomputers. The first version was written by Marty Browne, the “Father of MANMAN”, (who remained at ASK until 1993) using IMAGE and FORTRAN on an HP 2100later renamed the HP 1000. After the first 20 versions were shipped, it was ported to the more powerful HP 3000. MANMAN helped manufacturing companies plan materials purchases, production schedules, and other administrative functions on a scale that was previously possible only on large, costly mainframe computers. MANMAN initially had a five-figure software price and was aimed at small and medium-sized manufacturers.

From December 1980, small companies desiring the least expensive implementation could use the software on a time-sharing contract, called ASKNET.

MANMAN competed with other products which ran on minicomputers and such as NCA Corporation's Maxcim, HP's own MM/3000 and the IBM's mainframe-based MAPICS.

MANMAN was an enormous success and quickly came to dominate the market for manufacturing systems and software. ASK's fortunes rose as a result. In 1981 the corporation went public on the Nasdaq, with stock symbol ASKI. At the time of the IPO, ASK had MANMAN licensed at approximately 200 manufacturing companies, 98 employees, and revenue of $13m, quadrupling in just two years.

Two years later, Sandra Kurtzig's personal stake in the firm was worth more than $40 million.

=== International operations ===
In August 1977, ASK licensed Scicon Ltd to distribute and support MANMAN in Europe with a primary focus on the UK. Partially prompted by Scicon's success in signing approximately 100 customers by 1986, ASK negotiated a transfer of the licences to a newly formed subsidiary, ASK (UK), with most of the employees and customers transferring to the new entity. Other European subsidiaries were formed in West Germany and France shortly after, alongside new subsidiaries in Japan and Australia.

International Development took place in the UK and Switzerland, focusing on local tax and other legislation. Because MANMAN relied on hard-coded English strings, full localisation was economically unfeasible. Although German and French adaptations were attempted, the software was ultimately distributed and used almost exclusively in English.

By 1992, international revenue accounted for 49% of the total revenue. with 100 employees based in Europe.

== Expansion and peak (1983–1989) ==
=== ASK Micro (March 1983 – June 1984) ===
In March 1983, ASK made its first acquisition, purchasing a privately held software company named Software Dimensions, Inc., publisher of Accounting Plus, for $6 million. After acquiring Software Dimensions, Kurtzig renamed it ASK Micro and launched an aggressive marketing program. ASK over-hired and mismanaged the sales channel for the product, angering existing sellers and ballooning the cash burn rate for the company; the product faltered. In June 1984, Kurtzig announced that she was shutting down ASK Micro, at a cost of $1 million, and auctioning off the rights to Accounting Plus. Of the company's failings in the emerging personal computer market, Kurtzig told BusinessWeek, "We have our fingerprints all over the murder weapon" that killed Software Dimensions. ASK never launched a product in the microcomputer market, preferring to focus attention on the much more lucrative minicomputer sector, which was better suited to its sales model.

=== Migration to DEC VAX ===
The rise of the VAX from Digital Equipment Corporation (DEC) in the 1980s with VAX/VMS, a 32-bit Operating System with a large virtual memory space, and support for a higher number of connected terminals (a limitation of the HP3000 at the time) meant access to larger enterprise customers. In response, ASK chose to launch MANMAN on VAX/VMS. Because VMS had a distinct database based on a CODASYL network model (confusingly called DBMS) which differed from HP's IMAGE and VAX FORTRAN was particularly powerful the software was rewritten for the VMS platform in 1982 rather than a directly ported, This resulted in a build that was technically distinct yet (almost) functionally equivalent for the end user.

=== MANMAN: product expansion (1984–1989) ===
Magazine advert which ran from 1983 to 1989

In 1984, Kurtzig named Ronald W. Branniff president of the company, and in 1985 he took over her post of CEO as well. ASK had strong growth in the early 80s due to a rapidly increasing product portfolio. However, a slowdown in the manufacturing sector in 1986 led to a decline of $5.89 million on revenues of $76 million (the company remained profitable). Exacerbating the problem, Kurtzig and her family also began selling off large blocks of their stock holdings in the company, which triggered a shareholder lawsuit.

ASK acquired NCA Corporation for $43 million in cash in 1987, which was seen as a significant premium, but it did provide a boost in revenue.

Despite these advances, ASK was losing ground to its competitors. In its research and development activities, ASK began to focus nearly all of its resources on creating and improving products on its existing HP & VAX platforms instead of looking to new ones. By this time the conversational, scrolling user interface was starting to look dated,as consumers were now getting used to Graphical User Interfaces such as Apple Mac.

In 1987 ASK moved into a purpose-built new building at 2440 West El Camino Real, Mountain View in 1987. This, and costly investments such as international offices and a large project to port MANMAN to IBM, led to a sharp decline in profit over the next two years.

In mid-1989, with its price-sales ratio (revenue multiple) down to 0.5, the ASK managing board approached Kurtzig and asked her to resume an active role in the company, and she accepted their invitation. To quickly bolster profitability, ASK shut down its own IBM development and instead purchased Data 3 Systems for $18.7 million, a privately owned competitor which ran on IBM: ASK ran it as a separate business, based in San Ramon, CA.

== Final Years (1990–1994) ==
The two acquisitions, and a continued international expansion led to a big improvement in earnings, and ASK reached $200m in revenue by 1990.

ASK knew that a technology shift was needed, to satisfy IT departments that wanted a Unix system and end users that wanted a more modern user experience. The IBM project team was redeployed to a new product on a database and tools from the Ingres Corporation. See Ask Advance below.

To minimise its risks as the project ballooned in manpower and cost, in 1990, ASK purchased Ingres. The complex deal called for 30 percent of ASK to be sold to Hewlett-Packard and Electronic Data Systems (EDS) for a total of $60 million, which in turn enabled ASK to pay $110 million for Ingres. ASK's stockholders complained about this strange multi-way financing move. Shareholder James Lennane, who held ten percent of the company's shares, attempted and failed to oust the company's board of directors at the next shareholders' meeting. Despite this, the deal proceeded as planned. Hewlett-Packard made the hardware upon which much of ASK's software ran, and ASK resold Hewlett-Packard products as part of its software packages. As part of the deal EDS would run ASKs ASKNET business. Both Hewlett-Packard and EDS had strong histories of involvement with manufacturing businesses, and this heritage promised to open more potential markets for ASK.

With its new purchases, ASK had moved beyond its original scope to become a much larger, software company, selling applications, tools and services. The unified ASK and Ingres group had yearly revenues of $400 million.

Although this seemed like good news, ASK had mediocre results over the next several quarters, due to a lull in business while the company tried to bring new products to market. As well as its competitors on its traditional platforms (SSA, JD Edwards, QAD) ASK started to see competition from Oracle, SAP and Peoplesoft.

In 1992, the company finally launched its new version of MANMAN, called Manman/X, which ran on Unix and was built on the code base of a competitive product called Triton 2.2d, from Dutch company Baan from whom ASK had acquired the rights to the code base and distribution in 1990. Baan was little known outside Europe, so there was a good opportunity with ASK's sophisticated US sales force. It retained its "not-built-here feel", there was no coexistence or migration from existing products.

In 1992, ASK was restructured to better reflect the nature of its operations. The company was renamed ASK Group, Inc., and comprised three business units — ASK Computer Systems, Data 3, and Ingres. With these acquisitions by 1992, the whole group had 91 sales offices. In 17 countries and 2,300 employees worldwide; revenues had doubled to $432m, MANMAN was in use at 2,000 sites, although the original MANMAN business had actually decreased by 25%.

With the merger of ASK and Ingres completed, Kurtzig resigned as CEO in 1991, but remained non-executive chairman until 1992. Although ASK appeared to be on solid footing to face the computer industry's challenging, competitive environment, its fortunes continued to decline. ASK's annual revenues remained at around $400m before being acquired by Computer Associates in 1994 for $311m.

== MANMAN product family ==
=== MANMAN ===
MANMAN was a family of Enterprise resource planning (ERP) marketed for Hewlett Packard HP-3000 and Digital Equipment Corporation (DEC) minicomputers. written and sold by ASK Group, founded by Sandra Kurtzig.

The product family's name, MANMAN, was "short for manufacturing management," Its core components (referred to as the "4-core") consisted of:

- MANMAN/MFG: to help plan and track the manufacturing process and run MRP
- MANMAN/OMAR: (Originally FINMAN) Order Management and Accounts Receivable.
- MANMAN/AP: accounts payable
- MANMAN/GL: general ledger

Other products included

- MANMAN/FA: for managing Fixed Asset accounting to comply with US tax law
- MANMAN/GRAFMAN to allow simple graphs to be drawn on specialised terminals
- MANMAN/QUIZ a licensing agreement to resell the QUIZ Powerhouse reporting tool from Cognos

Some of the ideas for these application programs came from founder Kurtzig's exposure to several areas within General Electric, known to be synonymous with a well-run manufacturing operation."

In 1985, a larger number of new products were released, and the software was made ready for international expansion by adding foreign currency support and VAT tax.

- MANMAN/Serviceman: provided support for a distributed service maintenance environment, originally written by Scicon Ltd
- MANMAN/Repetitive: An enhancement for Repetitive (vs discrete) manufacturing
- MANMAN/Barscan: Provided support to produce barcode labels which were Code 3 of 9 compatible
- MANMAN/DecisionMaker: Analytics package providing summary reports
- MANMAN/Projects: provide Project Accounting
- MANMAN/Quality: Allowed construction of a quality management process via sampling and surveys
- MANMAN/Planman: Taking advantage of the burgeoning PC market, allowing both budgeting and scheduling to be shared between a PC and the server

Other products brought to market later included

- MANMAN/Engineer: A link to CAD systems for Product Design
- MANMAN/Tracker An add-on to MFG which allowed lot tracking, especially for pharmaceuticals
- MANMAN/Dataport An interface technology for linking multiple systems together

Specific industry solutions were also developed and sold: MANMAN/PROCESS was a specific solution for mixed-mode and process manufacturing environments. (VAX only) and MANMAN/AUTOMOTIVE was a solution for suppliers to automobile manufacturers. (VAX and HP). systems. Specialised solutions for Human Resources and Payroll were acquired and remarketed as MANMAN products. Eventually, MANMAN had 20 modules.

=== MAXCIM ===
Maxcim remained a separate product after the acquisition of NCA in 1987. It was also a manufacturing suite, and was better suited for process industries. It also ran on VAX, and was particularly popular among the hardware suppliers to DEC. 600 companies ran MAXCIM by 1991.

=== MANMAN on IBM ===
ASK hoped to capitalise on the rise of the AS/400 range of IBM minicomputers by launching a version on IBM hardware. The project ran during 1988 and 1989 before being cancelled. The IBM strategy was fulfilled with the acquisition of DATA3.

=== ASK/ADVANCE ===
In February 1990, Kurtzig announced the intended launch of a new client-server version of MANMAN: with the client on Unix Workstations, and the server running Ingres tools and database. It was to mimic the functionality of the "4 Core" modules and was originally intended to ship by December 1990. It aimed to use a beta version of Ingres GUI development environment called Windows/4GL. This was the first time ASK said it was developing an ERP product as opposed to merely MRP. This initiative led to the subsequent acquisition of Ingres. It was renamed Advance, in 1991, but the product was discontinued in 1993, effectively replaced by MANMAN/X.

=== MANMAN/X ===
In 1992 the company introduced MANMAN/X, an update of its flagship product. MANMAN/x was built on the code base of a product called Triton 2.2d, from Dutch company Baan. ASK had acquired the rights to the code base and distribution by 1991. Pricing was user-based and started at $25,000 for an 8-user system. For a 128-user system, MANMAN / X was typically priced at $250,000–$300,000.

=== MANMAN after ASK ===
The MANMAN portfolio was acquired by Computer Associates in 1994 and added to CA’s Interbiz products group. MANMAN/X was renamed as CA-MANMAN/X and Computer Associates successfully won a lawsuit with Baan giving them rights to all the Baan source code. It was later renamed MK, an acronym for Manufacturing Knowledge.

The HP & DEC versions were not originally Y2K-compliant, and in 1997 Computer Associates released Y2K compliant versions called MANMAN 10.0, which used date-windowing. Because MANMAN was heavily customised, many companies decided to migrate away from CA-MANMAN.

CA-MANMAN was subsequently sold to SSA Global in 2002 and remarketed it as part of their Interbiz suite. SSA in turn sold all of their ERP products to Infor (who had also acquired Baan) in 2006. Third-party companies offered support for MANMAN when the underlying Operating Systems from HP and DEC were no longer supported.

It was reported in 2016 that several dozen companies were still using the product despite HP announcing the end of life for HP 3000 in 2006.
