= Resource planning =

Resource planning may refer to:

- Enterprise resource planning (ERP), a kind of business-management software
- Integrated resource planning (IRP) in the electrical grid
- Manufacturing resource planning (MRP and MRPII), a method for handling resources of a manufacturing company
- Distribution resource planning (DRP), a method for planning orders within a supply chain
- Human resources planning (HR), the consideration of HR needs in overall goals and strategies
- Natural resource management, the management of natural resources such as land, water, soil, plants and animals
