= Backflush accounting =

Backflush accounting is a subset of management accounting focused on types of "postproduction issuing;" It is a product costing approach, used in a Just-In-Time (JIT) operating environment, in which costing is delayed until goods are finished. Backflush accounting delays the recording of costs until after the events have taken place, then standard costs are used to work backwards to 'flush' out the manufacturing costs. The result is that detailed tracking of costs is eliminated. Journal entries to inventory accounts may be delayed until the time of product completion or even the time of sale, and standard costs are used to assign costs to units when journal entries are made. The backflushing transaction has two steps: one step of the transaction reports the produced part which serves to increase the quantity on-hand of the produced part and a second step which relieves the inventory of all the component parts. Component part numbers and quantities-per are taken from the standard bill of material (BOM). This represents a huge saving over the traditional method of a) issuing component parts one at a time, usually to a discrete work order, b) receiving the finished parts into inventory, and c) returning any unused components, one at a time, back into inventory.

It can be argued that backflush accounting simplifies costing since it ignores both labor variances and work-in-process. Backflush accounting is employed where the overall business cycle time is relatively short and inventory levels are low.

Backflush accounting is inappropriate when production process is long, and this has been attributed as a major flaw in the design of the concept. It may also be inappropriate if the bill of materials contains not only piece goods but also many parts with more or less variable consumption. If the parts with variable consumption are just a few, like grease or the ink used to print product-labels, the consumed quantities can be assigned to product-independent cost centers at the withdrawal from stores (preproduction issuing) and can eventually be broken down afterwards to specific products or product groups, just like any other indirect or overhead expense. Difficulties maintaining correct inventories on shop floor may also appear if it is usual practice to use alternative materials and/or quantities without needing derogation. Therefore, in case of a more complex production system, it is a better approach to use a Manufacturing Execution System (MES) which gathers real production data and is able to deliver exact data to the accounting software or Enterprise resource planning-system where the goods issue is recorded. Thus, variances in consumption, in comparison to the standard bill of materials, are taken into account and assigned to the correct product, production order and workplace. Another advantage of using a MES is that it implements also the Production Track & Trace and the status of work in progress is also known in real time. A disadvantage of MES is that it is not suitable for small series or prototype production. Such type of production should be segregated from the series production and mass production.

== Meaning of backflushing ==
From a financial accounting perspective, backflushing is a technique of the perpetual inventory system. Small businesses which have a low variety of items in their inventory still use periodic inventory management. A periodic inventory system does not require day-to-day tracking of physical inventory. Purchases, cost of goods sold, and inventory on hand cannot be tracked until the end of the accounting time period when a physical inventory is performed and ending inventory is compared against the sum of beginning inventory and purchases. Cost of ending inventory can be calculated by using the LIFO or FIFO inventory accounting methods, or other less common methods. The end of the accounting period is considered usually the end of each month because otherwise some taxes like the VAT (value added tax) cannot be charged. The monthly stock-taking is the main disadvantage of the periodic inventory system. Another disadvantage is that it requires also monthly a reconciliation between the records of the management accounting and the financial accounting.

The main difference between the periodic inventory and the perpetual inventory is that the perpetual inventory does not keep the inventory-balance by using the inventory accounts, instead the entire input is booked immediately on the expense accounts. The principle is the following: output= initial inventory + input - final inventory

At the end of the accounting period the inventory is assessed through stock-taking: inventory asset account = expense account

At the beginning of the accounting period the stock is canceled using the opposite booking: expense account = inventory asset account

During the accounting period any input is booked directly to the expense account. For example, if we buy materials the bookings are:

material account = supplier account

material expense account = material account

At the end of the accounting period, at the stock-taking the booking will be material account = material expenses account

Development of more sophisticated computer scanning of inventory has allowed regular use of perpetual inventory systems by companies. According to the generally accepted accounting principles (GAAP), companies can use either perpetual inventory systems or periodic inventory systems. Perpetual inventory management is a system where store balances of inventory are recorded after every transaction. It eliminates the need for the store to close down constantly for inventory stock-taking as perpetual inventory systems allow for continuous stock-taking. Perpetual inventory systems keep a running account of the company's inventory. Perpetual inventory systems involve more record-keeping than periodic inventory systems. Every inventory item is kept on a separate ledger. These inventory ledgers contain information on cost of goods sold, purchases, and inventory on hand. Perpetual inventory management systems allow for a high degree of control of the company's inventory by management. Perpetual inventory management is generally used by companies who have the ability to scan the inventory items.

In the context of perpetual inventory, backflushing is automatic accounting of material consumed for production, at the time of confirmation of the production, e.g., when a 4-wheeler automobile is rolled out from assembly line, 4 wheels and tires are deemed to be consumed and issued to production order automatically by way of back flushing by the system. Typically, the assembly line has its own limited stock of materials as work in process. This stock is replenished by transferring materials from a warehouse (store) into the assembly lines own designated location, e.g., a supermarket. At goods receipt the consumed materials are posted automatically from the location designated to the issuing production line. In other words, back flushing refers only to materials which are already withdrawn from the inventory of the warehouse (store) and were delivered to the shop floor. Parts are issued from stores to Work-In-Process inventory, but not based on a job order or for a specific production order. They are issued in quantities estimated to cover requirements of individual work centers and production lines. The issuing may be used to cover a period of time or to fill a fixed—size container. But unlike the traditional approach, also known as "preproduction issuing," where the costs are assigned to the product order at the withdrawal of materials from the stores and after completion of production any excess material is given back to the stores, backflushing delays that until the goods receipt of the finished product or assembly is issued. The remaining quantity of unused material left on the shops is still held in the system as floor stock and so material will not be ordered incorrectly through the Manufacturing resource planning (MRP). By eliminating work-in-process accounts, backflush costing simplifies the accounting process. However, this simplification and other deviations from traditional costing systems mean that backflush costing may not always conform to generally accepted accounting principles (GAAP). Another drawback of this system is the lack of a sequential audit trail. The main advantage of postproduction issuing, not necessarily of backflushing, is that there is no need to update the store balances of inventory at the withdrawal of the materials from stores and recording the excess material through reverse posting (storno). This is especially useful in series or mass production where it is no need to give back excess material to the stores because it is used for the next production order. Even if excess material is given back to stores it does not involve any update to the inventory balance in the financial accounting (stock accounts). It involves only a stock transfer in the inventory management or warehouse management. Only the materials reported as consumed through the method of backflushing or by the MES imply an update to the inventory balance:

material account = material expenses account

Back flush is used for materials which are required for the product and have a fixed relationship with it. Depending on how backflushing is implemented in the accounting software being used and depending on organizational rules, the back flushing may create error records which need to be analyzed by someone in charge for the cost accounting. One possible reason for the creation of these error records can be that there is no sufficient book inventory available in the designated back flushing location (shop floor). By simply deleting the error record, without working it out, could mean that the costs are not assigned correctly to products and/or even that the expenses in the financial accounting (inventory accounts) are not being recorded. The error record as such, is not a specific consequence of using back flushing. It may exist also when a MES system is being used when no back flushing is needed. The reason for this is that any error in transmitting and/or interpreting the data being sent by the MES system to the ERP system is consigned and needs to be worked out. When using back flushing, any scrap, material usage variance (using more or less than specified in the BOM) or substitution must be reported separately in order to maintain acceptable inventory accuracy. These are typically implemented as unplanned transactions. The downside of unplanned transactions is that they are prone to error. Unplanned inventory transactions must be eliminated and replaced creatively with planned transactions because even a very low percentage of misreported transactions will take inventory accuracy quickly to an unacceptable level. That is why the usage of backflushing is recommended only if 2 conditions are met: low I/O Variation and low Production Lead Times. Without low part I/O variation through low scrap, non-standard usage, and substitution, system inventory levels become unreliable. The exception transactions just cannot come through quickly or accurately enough to tame the beast. Loss of trust in the system occurs. Without short manufacturing lead times, components get moved into production but don't get relieved right away from the ERP inventory. This leads to confusion. Evident discrepancies between physical and system inventory counts cause frustration and lack of trust in the system. Without accurate and timely inventory levels, internal production plans and external purchase orders cannot be scheduled effectively, leading to inventory shortages and excess inventory. Inventory shortages cause disruptions to the manufacturing schedule, forcing additional setups, forced substitutions, overtime, premium freight charges, missed shipments and lost capacity. Excess inventory increases obsolescence and consumes precious cash flow and shelf space. Both excess inventory and shortages can indirectly lead to poor quality. A plant cannot cycle-count its way to accurate inventories. Cycle counting is not timely enough to be of benefit. And cycle counts are more likely to introduce errors than to correct them.

== Alternatives to backflushing ==
If the nature of a manufacturing process is such that component usage variation is natural and unavoidable, and/or production lead times are long, an ERP implementation design that entails a different methodology than backflushing from the shop-floor stock is required. There are two strategies used to deliver materials to the shop floor: Push and Pull, see Push–pull strategy. Depending on which strategy is being used and depending on how it is implemented, backflushing can be eliminated.

Alternatives to Backflushing when using the Push-strategy

The traditional way of issuing consumed materials is by using dual issues and returns against work orders. Components are counted when issued to a production order from Stores when the production order is opened. Produced parts and leftover components are counted when returned to stores when the work order is closed. In conjunction with a tightly controlled material Stores with discrete storage places, this can deliver very high inventory accuracy without the need for additional transactions to report scrap, material substitution, and non-standard usage separately. This obviously requires more transactions than backflushing. But these can be automated in a variety of ways, especially since most transactions take place in a limited area (Stores) and not throughout the plant. Accountability for component usage and operator time/efficiency at the work-order level by operator/shift/cell is greatly increased in this method over backflushing. Work orders also deliver higher lot-control quality measurement potential, substitution management (through a modified work-order BOM) and higher part and customer container bar-coding accuracy. The shop-floor stock in this case uses a discrete storage bin, identical to the number of the production order but no backflushing is required when the produced parts are counted. Leftover components are returned to the store and all the components from the discrete shop-floor storage bin are issued against that production order (postproduction issuing), in a similar way like backflushing, but not based on the bill of materials (BOM) but on the real stock which was consumed (transferred from the stores) for that particular production order.

The downside of this method is that it may not be suited for a more complex and repetitive production because it requires perfect contention of the WIP (raw materials and assemblies) on the shop floor: the materials issued to a production order shouldn't interfere with another production order or the next production order of the same kind. This can be done only if all work-steps required to complete the production order are limited more or less to a single workplace. That is why this kind of approach can be implemented for complex products only by using the push strategy. Push strategy means that a complex finished product is divided into many smaller assemblies and even assemblies may contain smaller assemblies and so on. All these assemblies will receive their own production order. These production orders are usually created automatically by the MRP\ERP - system. The ERP system uses Manufacturing resource planning (MRP) for the planning of production orders. Usually only the production planning for the finished product is done manually by the production planner, the assemblies are planned automatically based on backward scheduling. This is especially useful if the assemblies are being produced in another production line, workshop or plant. The downside of MRP and Push strategy is that it usually leads to larger stocks in the supply chain. That is why Push is regarded as the opposite of lean production because lean production involves the Pull strategy which means that any part should only be produced if there is a certain demand for it and therefore WIP will be small. Push strategy is when MRP is used also to schedule production orders for semi-finished products (assemblies) based on the forecasted demand of the finished product. These assemblies are put into stores without any reference to a certain production order of the finished product. The finished product may not even have had production orders released at the time the assembly was delivered to the store. That is why using MRP to schedule the execution of production orders is by definition a push system because releases are made according to a master production schedule without regard to system status. Hence, no a priori WIP limit exists. However MRP can be designed in such a way that it has an explicit WIP constraint. That means that assemblies are not produced further if a certain level of inventory is reached. MRP with a WIP constraint can be regarded as a pull system. However, even if a WIP constraint is implemented, Push-strategy generally means that the time, needed from the first operation or assembly until the finished good is obtained, is much longer as opposed to pull-strategy. This is due to the lead-times needed for each assembly and can be analyzed by using a technique called Value stream mapping. There is usually also much more handling: putting the assemblies into the stores, picking the assemblies from stores to the next production step (order) which uses the assembly to make another assembly or finished product. In reality, most firms use both strategies. For example: you could use MRP (push) without WIP constraint to schedule assemblies that are produced in another workshop, plant or external supplier and Kanban (pull) in your own plant. You can also use Kanban to schedule the assemblies in another workshop or plant, but it is usually not done when these assemblies are produced on large machines because with MRP the demand of several days can be comprised in bigger lot sizes of production orders of similar type in such a way that the workshops own scheduling system (MES) is then able to use the available machine-capacity better by bringing the production orders into an optimal sequence using suitable algorithms. This is usually the case when the machines are expensive, their number is relatively small and they have big output-capacities and setup time is expensive. Implementing Kanban in such a case would require to use a bigger number of smaller\cheaper machines, dedicated to certain production lines, in order to react more flexibly to the demand. Another requirement would be that the frequency of transports from\to that plant to be higher and the distance to that plant to be relatively small. These requirements however, cannot be accomplished in each case. On the other side, the workshop (supplier) which manufactures the assemblies may very well use a push strategy or a pull-strategy for delivering the needed materials to each of its own machines.

As described above, this alternative to backflushing has a self-correcting property: the shop-floor stock is always related to a certain production order, onto which all the consumed materials were actually issued. On the other hand, backflushing by its very definition can never be self-correcting and should only be used when corrections are rarely needed. An objection can be made with the above described alternative that scrap is not reported with a reason code, or broken out separately from other forms of non-standard usage. But how accurate is scrap reporting in an environment without inventory accuracy? Better to settle for inventory accuracy and worry about scrap later as a separate issue. Option: implement a separate scrap analysis protocol unrelated to inventory transactions. Scrapped parts are segregated for subsequent inspection, quality data recording and possible rework. In both cases, scrapped parts are already removed from inventory at the end of the manufacturing cycle (presumably by returning fewer components to stores). Therefore, an inventory transaction is only needed when parts are deemed acceptable upon inspection, or after a rework operation is performed. Scrap reporting can also be done by using data from the Process control system and/or Manufacturing Execution System. Usually such a system exists to some degree in any firm, even if it is not called PCS or MES and even if it is used eventually only for keeping data regarding personnel performance and piecework, as a basis for calculating the salary of the workers. Such a system could be extended so that each worker reports also the scrapped parts.

More technical requirements like Production Track & Trace, Overall Equipment Efficiency, Production Performance analysis or displaying production progress of a production order in real time should always be implemented as part of an MES. It is a bad approach to implement such systems more or less just for the sake of inventory accuracy. Inventory accuracy should be attained through much simpler means, as described above and should not depend for example on the quality of the scrap reporting. The same is true the other way around: for example if you need Production Track & Trace (which components belonging to which lots were incorporated into a product with a given serial number) you shouldn't rely solely on the components issued as consumed for a specific production order, especially when using backflushing that would be a bad idea.

The same is true for production scheduling: an ERP\MRP can be used to schedule production orders (to establish deadlines for their delivery) as well as to schedule goods receipts from the suppliers. It is also a very useful tool to offer data for internal usage about medium to long-term demand and\or planning or a forecast for external suppliers based on BOM explosion. But ERP\MRP is usually not very useful for scheduling operations on the shop-floor. A production planner using ERP may oversee total gross-capacity demand for all or for a certain type of operation but may not see bottlenecks on individual machines or workplaces. It is the job of the scheduling system (MES) to dispatch the production orders received from the ERP to individual machines\work places. When lean production is used (Pull), see next chapter, the production order received from the ERP usually refers to a finished product or to a more complex assembly. In this case, the scheduling system is even more important because it has to dispatch parts of the production order to individual work-places.

Alternatives to Back flushing when using the Pull-strategy

Pull strategy means that work centers request the materials needed for a specific production order from the store or from an upstream workplace (demand driven). Usually this means that semi-finished products are produced for a specific production order of the finished product and therefore stocks held in the supply chain are better managed (usually smaller). This can be accomplished by using Kanban. Kanban is essentially a production scheduling system. It can be used together with a Process control system to make a Manufacturing Execution System. A Process control system gathers data from the work places where the production order is executed. It receives the individual workloads assigned by the scheduling system to individual work places. The purpose of the scheduling system is to optimize the usage of resources. For scheduling the production of individual workplaces, Kanban can be used solely or a more complex optimization software is necessary. Usually a scheduling system based on an optimization software is necessary if the production is executed on machines and it is non-trivial to decide on which machine a specific production order should be executed in order to use resources optimally. Such a type of scheduling problem is known as Job shop scheduling or Flow shop scheduling. Job shop scheduling means that each production order needs to be executed only on one machine for completion and the problem is to get the optimal sequence of orders for a specific machine and, in case that we have several machines that are able to execute the same order, to assign the order to the machine that has available resources. Flow shop scheduling means that a production order has to pass several types of work-centers (machines) in a predefined order. This is a more complex problem than "job shop scheduling" because after completion of one work-step, the system has to assign an available machine for the next type of operation until all operations for a given production order are completed. Regardless of the type of scheduling problem the algorithm needed to accomplish this task has n! complexity (n factorial). There is a well known similar type of problem called the Travelling salesman problem. Only very small problems of this kind can be solved using Brute-force search. A simple example: Let's assume that we have only one machine and 20 production orders. Due dates have no importance. We want to put these 20 production orders in the optimal sequence so that the overall setup time is minimal. All setup times needed to switch from one order to the other are known and may be different: setting the machine up from order1 to order2 may need 1 minute, but from order 2 to order1 the time may be different from 1 minute. So we have permutations of size 2 for 20 objects which equals 320 distinct pairs of setup costs. But there are 20!= 2,432 * 10^18 distinct possibilities for putting the 20 orders in a sequence. Enumerating each possibility is not feasible because there are 2,432 * 10^18 possibilities. Therefore, Heuristic algorithms are used for solving problems of this kind. These algorithms do not guarantee to find the optimal solution, but they usually find a solution in the vicinity of the optimal solution in a reasonably short period of time. So the meaning of a MES is to be able to use such heuristic algorithms in order to fulfill the business policy. The business policy defines how the antagonistic restrictions are weighted, which of them are more important. These antagonistic restrictions are: delivery deadlines, machine setup time and machine usage. The scheduling system knows everything about the capabilities of the machines, the available tools and so on, and it can therefore make an optimal decision, which work-place (machine) should execute which part of the production order and when. Of course the operator should be able to refuse the order if something unpredictable has happened (a tool is missing or not operational etc.) and the system should be able to reschedule the order automatically or with the aid of a production planner or supervisor. A MES has to be a dynamic system which can react to the real and unpredictable events.

In such an environment, where the production order received form the ERP\MRP software is scheduled using a MES or Kanban and the materials are assigned to the shop floor at the withdrawal from stores, there is no need for using backflushing. The materials are usually issued from the stores to a supermarket on the shop floor without being related to a specific production order but in the amount needed to cover the demand of the already released production orders. This amount is dynamic, and we call it "Kanban-quantity." It should be calculated in real-time by the MES. The supermarket itself can be regarded as a derogation from the principles of lean production, especially from those of the "One Piece Flow" concept, because it represents work in progress, WIP, which is not yet assigned to a specific production order being executed or which has been already released for production. The stock in the supermarket is already issued to the shop floor stock. The usage of a supermarket is usually necessary when not all of the individual work steps which are needed for the completion of the production order have the same execution time and therefore a small buffer is needed to avoid that one workplace is waiting for an upstream workplace to complete work. This buffer is usually maintained using 2 containers in the supermarket in which such kind of assemblies are stored. If none of the containers is empty, no further assemblies are being produced. If one of the container is empty, the remaining container is swapped with the empty one (FIFO) and production of the assembly is resumed according to the kanban-quantity computed by the MES. Another purpose of the supermarket is that it enables a quick replenishment of the workplaces with the needed raw-materials without the necessity for taking these materials from the store for each production order as opposed to the above described push-strategy where every material has to be issued to every production order at the withdrawal from stores. In other words, the quantity of any assembly or raw-material being stored in the supermarket is strictly limited, there is an explicit WIP constraint. Usually the supermarket is placed in the proximity of the work-places, so that the work-places have quick access to the needed materials. Every material has its own storage location in the supermarket (coordinates) so that it can be easily located when needed. The materials to be consumed are assigned by each workplace to the production order either by scanning them at the withdrawal from the supermarket (preproduction issuing) or by reporting them through the MES and Process control system (postproduction issuing).

Usually the first approach (scanning at the withdrawal) is used for materials which are piece goods. If the materials are not piece goods (bulk material, yard ware), then the workplace has to report the consumed quantities after it has finished its job on a particular production order. If a process control system is being used then the process control system will report the consumed materials directly to the ERP\MRP- System or to the MES and then the MES reports to the ERP. If no process control system is used, usually the case when manual work is being done, the consumed quantities have to be reported manually from every workplace by using a terminal (scanner, PC, etc.). Usually, when using bulk materials, the workplace reports the consumed quantity on the level of the handling unit (HU). A handling unit is a number assigned to the carton, pallet or any other kind of unitized packaging. So the handling unit is assigned to the workplace, the consumed quantity from that HU is issued and the HU, if no longer needed is put back to the supermarket. As a direct consequence a partial withdrawal from that handling unit is issued as consumed also in the ERP\MRP system. Any physically empty HU is reported using a distinct transaction. That means that any residual book inventory quantity that may exist in the ERP system, assigned to the shop floor and to that specific HU is reported as consumed and issued to a distinct cost center. Inversely, should a workplace report a consumption from a HU that has no book inventory in the shop-floor stock (is already empty in the ERP system), an error is generated as a backlog in issuing the consumed materials, see chapter "Meaning of backflushing." What kind of unplanned transactions are used to handle this error is a question of internal policy of every firm.

The reason why residual book inventory may exist in the MRP/ERP system may have multiple causes. A few of them are: - the quantity in the original packaging was not completely exact (e.g. the supplier indicated a quantity of 10000 meters per coil, but some coils had only 9500 meters); - the workplace has consumed some materials for adjusting the machine without being able to report that quantity exactly; - the operator has omitted to assign a new handling unit to the workplace or has assigned the false handling unit. Such errors can be avoided if the system has a good data validation. For example, the machine does not start processing the job until all handling units required for that job are assigned to the work place or machine.

It is very important to design the interface between the MES and the MRP\ERP properly: the reporting of the consumed quantities has to be processed consistently, in the right order, in other words all the recorded/reported consumptions from a handling unit should be issued in the ERP before issuing the handling unit as empty. Otherwise a large number of false errors would get into the error-backlog because the book inventory is already zero as a consequence of issuing the handling unit as being empty before issuing all the consumption which refer to that specific handling unit.

These two alternatives to backflushing based on the pull-strategy (preproduction issuing/postproduction issuing) have also a self-correcting property: real quantities are reported from each workplace (not based on the bill of materials) and each unitized packaging (handling unit), when empty, is reported as empty and any residual book-inventory on the shopfloor is discarded.
