= Security check =

Security check may refer to:

- Checkpoint (disambiguation), for physical checks
- Background check, a process used to verify that an individual is who they claim to be
- Security check (scientology)
- Vetting, an enhanced form of background check
