= Checkpoint =

Checkpoint may refer to:

== Places ==
- Border checkpoint, a place on the land border between two states where travellers and/or goods are inspected
- Security checkpoint, erected and enforced within contiguous areas under military or paramilitary control
- Random checkpoint, a police or military checkpoint that is moved to various locations
- Weigh station, a highway checkpoint to inspect vehicular weights

== Arts and entertainment ==
- Checkpoint (G.I. Joe), a fictional character in the G.I. Joe universe
- Checkpoint (Transformers), two fictional characters in the Transformers universes
- Checkpoint (novel), a 2004 novel by Nicholson Baker
- Checkpoint (journal), 1969–1974
- Checkpoint (pinball), a 1991 pinball machine released by Data East
- Checkpoint (video games), locations in a video game where a player character respawns after death
- CheckPoint, a web series by sketch comedy group LoadingReadyRun

=== Film and television ===
- Checkpoint (1956 film), a British crime drama film
- Checkpoint (2003 film), a documentary on checkpoints in the Occupied West Bank
- Checkpoint (Dutch TV show), a popular Dutch children's TV show
- "Checkpoint" (Buffy the Vampire Slayer), a 2001 episode of the television series Buffy the Vampire Slayer
- Checkpost (film), a 1974 Indian film

== Science and technology ==
- Counting point, a concept in logistics

=== Biology ===
- Cell cycle checkpoint, control mechanisms in eukaryotic cell division
  - G1 restriction point
  - S postreplication checkpoint, prevents cell cycle progression until postreplication repair
  - G2-M DNA damage checkpoint
  - M spindle checkpoint, prevents anaphase onset until all chromosomes are properly attached to the spindle
- Immune checkpoint

=== Computing ===
- Application checkpointing, a method in computing whereby the state of a program is saved
- Transaction checkpoint, for recovery in data management

== Organisations ==
- Checkpoint Systems, a provider of merchandise availability solutions for the retail industry
- Checkpoint (rapid HIV testing facility), a former HIV testing facility based in Amsterdam
- Check Point, a software company that is best known for its firewall and VPN products
- Checkpoint, a tax and accounting database produced by Thomson Reuters

== Sports ==
- Control point (orienteering) or checkpoint, a marked waypoint used in orienteering and related sports
- Racing checkpoint, a specific point partway through a racing course where a contestant's subtotal time is recorded

== See also ==
- Checkpoint Charlie, a crossing point between East Berlin and West Berlin during the Cold War
