= Rootstock (disambiguation) =

A rootstock is part of a plant, often an underground part, from which new above-ground growth can be produced.

Rootstock may also refer to:

- Rootstock, part of a tree used as a natural navigational aid in orienteering
- Rootstock Manufacturing, a company providing enterprise resource planning software for manufacturing industries that acquired the Kenandy software company
- Rootstock Limited, an investment scheme supporting Radical Routes co-operatives
