= David Woodruff =

David Woodruff may refer to:

- David L. Woodruff (born 1956), American industrial engineer
- David P. Woodruff (David Paul Woodruff, born 1980), American computer scientist
- D. P. Woodruff (David Phillip Woodruff), British physicist
