= Salarium =

Salarium Ltd.
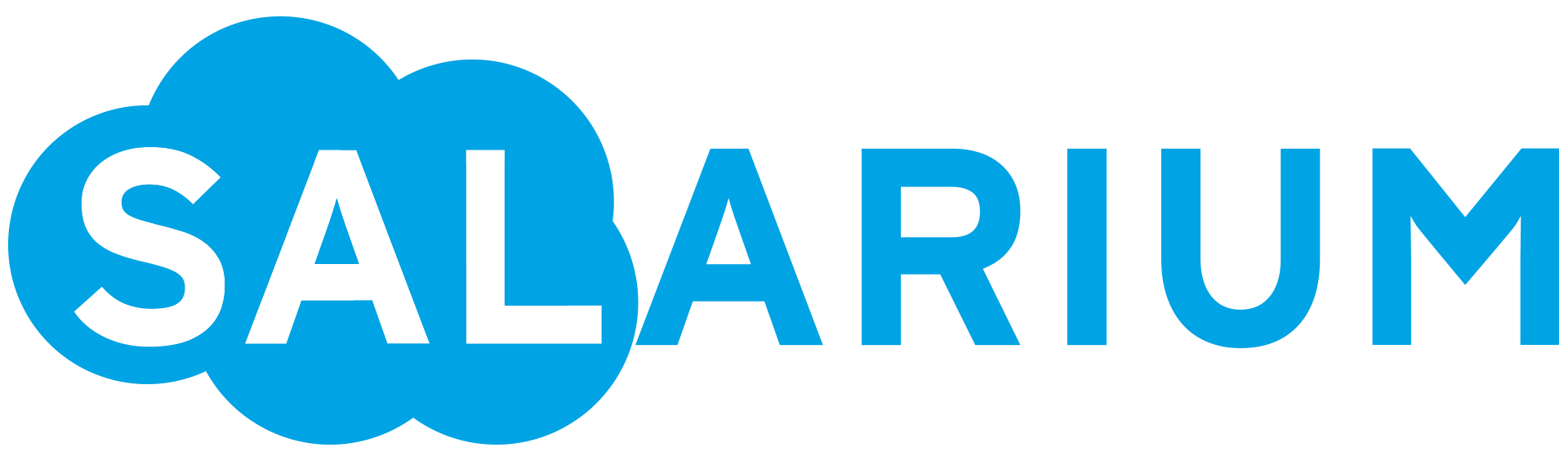
- Company type: Private
- Industry: Enterprise software
- Founded: 2013
- Headquarters: Makati, Philippines
- Number of locations: 1
- Key people: Judah Hirsch (CEO)
- Products: HRIS; Payroll; Disbursement
- Number of employees: 100+
- Website: www.salarium.com

Salarium is a SaaS end-to-end payroll automation company founded by Judah Hirsch in 2013. It is headquartered in Hong Kong and has an office in Manila, Philippines.

== History ==
In February 2014, Salarium won a global contest in Geneva, Switzerland, and landed an equity investment worth $500,000 from Seedstars World (SSW). In September 2014, Salarium was bootstrapped until it received its first round of investment in 2014 after winning the 2nd Seedstars World (SSW) startup competition.

In March 2015, Salarium signed a partnership with VMoney Inc. to use VMoney's funds disbursement platform to support its payroll automation software.

April 2015, the company formed a partnership with PyxPay, a mobile payment firm, to increase its service offerings under the name of SALPay. This enabled Salarium to pay its employees worldwide using an e-wallet.

In December 2017, SALPay partnered with Union Bank of the Philippines to incorporate its EON platform with the SALPay app.

In 2019, Salarium expanded its operations to within the Philippines. In March, the company began operating in Davao City, Mindanao, and then in Cebu City, Cebu, in July.

In August 2019, Salarium announced the launch of its updated payroll software, version 3.0.

On 31 December 2023, Salarium, a payroll management company in the Philippines, suspended its operations indefinitely following an incident on 18 December that impacted its services; this led to widespread customer complaints about inaccessible funds, accusations of potential financial mismanagement, and concerns about legal and financial troubles affecting both businesses and employees relying on its payroll system.
