= CCQ =

CCQ or ccq can refer to:

- Commission de la construction du Québec, an organization to support the construction industry in Québec province, Canada
- Civil Code of Quebec, a body of law for Québec province, Canada
- Center for Computational Quantum Physics, part of the Flatiron Institute, an American science and technology research organization
- Cataloging & Classification Quarterly, a peer-reviewed journal about library cataloguing
- Concept of Cumulative Quantities, a concept in cumulative quantities (logistics)
- Chile con queso, a sauce or dip common in Tex-Mex cuisine.
