= Available-to-promise =

Available-to-promise (ATP) is a business function that provides a response to customer order inquiries, based on resource availability. It generates available quantities of the requested product, and delivery due dates. Therefore, ATP supports order promising and fulfillment, aiming to manage demand and match it to production plans.

Available-to-promise functions are IT-enabled and usually integrated into enterprise management software packages. However, ATP execution may need to be adjusted for the way a certain company operates.

== Classification ==
A fundamental distinction between ATP functions is based on the push-pull strategy. Push-based ATP is based on forecasts regarding future demand - based on anticipation of demand, ATP quantities and availability dates are computed. A prominent example is the traditional determination of ATP based on the Master Production Schedule. The push-based approach is fundamentally limited by dependence on forecasts, which may prove inaccurate. Gross ATP represents the total available supply, and net ATP represents the supply remaining to support new demands, after existing commitments to customers have been accounted for.

Pull-based models, on the other hand, dynamically allocate resources in response to actual customer orders. This means that pull-based ATP is able to balance forecast-driven resource replenishment with order-triggered resource utilization, but because resources are allocated with each coming order, the process will yield myopic results.

== ATP Execution ==
ATP functions can be executed in real-time, driven by each individual order, or in batch mode – meaning that at a certain time interval, the system checks the availability for orders piled up in that period of time. The process is triggered by the need to check resource availability before making a commitment to deliver an order. For example, ATP calculation using SAP software depends on the level of "stock, planned receipts (production orders, purchase orders, planned orders and so on), and planned requirements (sales orders, deliveries, reservations, etc.)"
