= Cumulative quantities (logistics) =

Cumulative quantities are a concept in logistics that involves adding up required materials quantities over a defined time-window that can be drawn as a 'cumulative curve'. This concept is applied in serial production and mainly used in the automotive industry to plan, control and monitor production and delivery. The concept is sometimes called 'cumulative production figures principle' (CPGP).

== Closed-loop-cycle ==
The concept of cumulative quantities (CCQ) uses the feedback mechanism of a closed loop, which can be found in industrial, engineering and electronic systems. The target requirements are summarized for each time-interval and compared with the actual values for closed-loop control. Positive cumulative deviation for a certain time-interval requires no further order, while negative deviations require a new order. To "calm" production and material flow, upper and lower tolerance boundaries are defined, and only if these boundaries are violated is a renewed order.

To check the entire production and material flow, 'reporting limits' can be defined at a chosen counting point, and if a limit is exceeded, a concerned 'alert' is issued. The logistics staff has to explain the reason for the 'alert'. If the reason is correct and traceable, no further action is needed. If mistakes are present in the database, data processing or in data-acquisition, appropriate countermeasures are needed. Examples of mistakes or failures include wrong primary demand or bad forecasting, mistakes in the bill of material or master data, old master production schedules, inaccurate or delayed data acquisition, calculation mistakes, and the mounting of incorrect parts at the assembly line.

== Counting points ==
Target-actual-control-loop uses exactly defined counting points that demarcate the next-following intervals along the supply chain. The cumulative differences of next-following counting points show the quantities of material items which traverse the Interval and therefore offer transparency of the inventory of an item along the entire supply chain.

== Supply chain ==
Cumulative quantities are a part of official EDI-formats (e.g. EDIFACT – DELFOR) that are widely used by OEMs and their suppliers. Normally the data acquisition at 'goods receipt' are used for communication between consignee and goods dispatcher.

== See also ==
- Enterprise resource planning
- Material requirements planning

== Literature ==
- Hans-Peter Wiendahl (2010), Betriebsorganisation für Ingenieure (in German) (7. ed.), München: Hanser, ISBN 978-3-446-41878-3
- Hermann Lödding (2008), Verfahren der Fertigungssteuerung (in German) (2. ed.), Berlin, Heidelberg: Springer, ISBN 978-3-540-76859-3.
- Paul Schönsleben (2016), Integral Logistics Management: Operations and Supply Chain Management in Comprehensive Value-Added Networks (5th ed.), Boca Raton New York: Taylor and Francis Group, ISBN 978-1498750530
