= Social pull marketing =

The business terms push and pull originated in the logistic and supply chain management, but are also widely used in marketing.

Social pull marketing is the adaptation of the traditional push–pull strategy marketing concepts to social media websites. It utilizes the traditional "pull" concept for a new way of social media marketing. To get a basic understanding of what social pull marketing is, just think of people friending you rather than you friending people.

You or your company must create a need for someone to friend you or your company. That need could be information, electronic coupons, and other electronic items that people want, but that only your friends can get.

Facebook example:

If you own a small athletic shoe manufacturing company, your Facebook friends will receive a flow of information pertaining to the activities that your demographics would enjoy, such as marathon information, healthy eating, how to walk for exercise, or how to run or jog properly. Your Facebook friends would also receive special discounts via electronic coupons. By following this strategy, your Facebook friends are pre-qualified buyers.

Real-world experiment example:

Social pull marketing can be applied to all of the social media websites. "I would rather have 400 people who friended me, than 4,000 people that I friended. I would have 400 people who chose to be my friend; they are pre-qualified buyers. The 4,000 people I friended accepted my friend request only because I asked them and most likely will not pay attention to what I have to say on my social media website".

For this experiment, multiple RSS feeds for one topic (popular music) were used to generate one united RSS feed. The feed was sent through Twitter. For this experiment, no one actually tweeted; however, the test Twitter account now has over 400 followers in a few short months. This is proof that social pull marketing works. The people following the test Twitter account all chose to follow it, thereby building a list of Twitter followers who are interested in popular music.
