= Demand signal =

A demand signal is a message issued within business operations or within a supply chain to notify a supplier that goods are required, and is, therefore, a key item of information for demand planners within a business.

== Contexts ==
In a just-in-time manufacturing or operations context, a demand signal identifies a need for new materials and triggers a delivery from an internal store or an external supplier. The kanban system uses cards ('kanban cards') to mark the stock level at which a replenishment signal needs to be issued. Kanban cards are a key component of a kanban system as they signal the need to move materials within a production facility or to move materials from an outside supplier into the production facility. The kanban card is, in effect, a message which signals depletion of product, parts, or inventory. When received, the kanban triggers replenishment of that product, part, or inventory. Consumption, therefore, drives demand for more production, and the kanban card signals demand more product—so kanban cards help create a demand-driven system.

In the context of an enterprise resource planning (ERP) system, demand signals function as granular data indicating discrete requests for the supply or use of a resource. Demand signal management (DSiM) provides a means of harmonizing demand data so that it can be used in demand planning. Demand signals must bring together data on actual sales and date on unfulfilled demand in order to be effective.
