= David L. Woodruff =

American industrial engineer

- Born: December 4, 1956 (age 69)
- Occupations: Industrial engineer, academic and author

Academic background
- Education: BS., Industrial Engineering and Engineering Management; MS., Industrial Engineering and Engineering Management; PhD., Industrial Engineering and Management Sciences
- Alma mater: Stanford University; Northwestern University
- Doctoral advisor: Mark Spearman

David L. Woodruff is an American industrial engineer, academic, and author and Distinguished Professor Emeritus at the University of California, Davis. He is most known for contributing to the development of Pyomo and researching computational methods for optimal decision-making under uncertainty.

Woodruff has received awards for his work, including multiple teaching awards from the University of California, Davis, the 1990 JD Scaife Award from the Institution of Manufacturing Engineers, the 2016 R&D 100 World Magazine Award for Pyomo, the 2019 Institute for Operations Research and Management Sciences (INFORMS) Computing Society Prize for Pyomo, and the 2021 INFORMS Computing Society Distinguished Service Award. Among other honors, he was elected Fellow of INFORMS in 2024 and served as editor-in-chief of INFORMS Journal on Computing from 2013 to 2018.

== Education and early career ==
Woodruff earned a BS in 1979 and an MS in 1980, both in Industrial Engineering and Engineering Management from Stanford University. In 1980, he began working as Manager of Computing Facilities at Silvar-Lisco, before becoming President of Jewelers Computer Applications from 1982 to 1986. From 1985 to 1987, he served as a lecturer at the University of Wisconsin and as a Programmer Analyst at RMT. From 1987 to 1990, he studied at Northwestern University to pursue his doctoral studies in Industrial Engineering and Management Sciences under the supervision of Mark Spearman, working on aspects of CONWIP, and completed his PhD in 1990.

== Career ==
Woodruff joined the University of California, Davis, as an assistant professor in the Graduate School of Management (GSM) from 1990 to 1996, when he was appointed Associate Professor. Since 2001, he has been Professor of Management. Within the GSM, he acted as Associate Dean for Instructional Programs. He has also held the position of Faculty Chair of GSM across multiple terms, as Director of Concurrent Degree Programs, and as a member of the GSM Executive Committee at various times. He co-proposed the Master of Management degree program and played a role in its implementation. From 2023 until 2025, he held the position of associate dean of academic affairs.

Woodruff has also been engaged with professional organizations, particularly the Institute for Operations Research and Management Science (INFORMS) Computing Society (ICS). In 1998, he was appointed General Chair of the INFORMS Computer Science Technical Section meeting in Monterey, where he also edited the associated conference book. He later acted as Chair of ICS from 2001 to 2003 and represented the society on the INFORMS Subdivision Council. His involvement with ICS has also included positions such as Acting Editor-in-Chief of the ICS Newsletter for three years, Chair of the ICS Student Paper Award Committee, and member of both the ICS Service Award and the INFORMS Journal on Computing Test of Time Paper Prize committees. In addition to his work with INFORMS, he has contributed to the Stochastic Programming Society, serving a term on the Committee on Stochastic Programming and chairing the International Conference on Stochastic Programming. He edited a special issue of Computational Management Science associated with the conference and reviewed numerous papers as part of this effort.

== Research ==
Woodruff's research has spanned computational aspects of optimal decision-making, particularly in problems involving discrete and continuous choices across multiple time stages under significant uncertainty. His publications have comprised journal articles and monographs, focusing on solution algorithms, problem representation, and modeling language support, with applications in operations, logistics, and energy planning. In 2003, he co-authored Introduction to Computational Optimization Models for Production Planning in a Supply Chain with Stefan Voss, introducing optimization concepts for production planning, applying them to models like MRP and MRP II, and developing supply chain management models.

Woodruff has been involved in the development and release of several open-source software tools, such as Pyomo, an algebraic modeling language used in industry, government, and academia. In 2012, he co-wrote Pyomo ― Optimization Modeling in Python alongside William E. Hart, Carl Laird, and Jean-Paul Watson as a guide to Pyomo. Moreover, he has led the release of mape-maker, a tool designed to create scenarios for renewable energy decision-making, and cell2fire, a wildfire spread modeling tool used by government agencies and embedded in commercial software products. His contributions have also included parmest, a parameter estimation package within Pyomo, and PySP, an early open-source project for modeling optimization under uncertainty, which has been succeeded by MPI-SPPY.

In a paper awarded Best Paper of 2011 by Computational Management Science, Woodruff collaborated with Watson to improve the application of the progressive hedging algorithm for multi-stage stochastic programs with integer variables, addressing key implementation challenges and demonstrating that the proposed algorithmic improvements enhanced convergence and computational efficiency in large-scale mixed-integer problems. Furthermore, his research presented methods for generating day-ahead probabilistic solar power scenarios based on historical data, improving thermal generation optimization in power systems with high solar penetration, and observed that the approach performs similarly to quantile regression in terms of scenario quality.

Working with Jorge Oyola and Halvard Arntzen, Woodruff reviewed the past 20 years of research on stochastic vehicle routing problems (SVRP), categorizing problem variants and describing the solution methods applied to them.

== Awards and honors ==
- 1990 – JD Scaife Award, Institution of Manufacturing Engineers
- 2016 – R&D 100 Award, R&D 100 World Magazine
- 2019 – INFORMS Computing Society Prize, Institute for Operations Research and Management Science
- 2021 – Distinguished Service Award, Institute for Operations Research and Management Science
- 2024 – Fellow, Institute for Operations Research and Management Science

== Bibliography ==
=== Books ===
- Introduction to Computational Optimization Models for Production Planning in a Supply Chain (2003) ISBN 978-3-540-00023-5
- Pyomo ― Optimization Modeling in Python (2012) ISBN 978-3-319-58819-3

=== Selected articles ===
- Spearman, M. L., Woodruff, D. L., & Hopp, W. J. (1990). CONWIP: a pull alternative to kanban. The International Journal of Production Research, 28(5), 879–894.
- Rocke, D. M., & Woodruff, D. L. (1996). Identification of outliers in multivariate data. Journal of the American Statistical Association, 91(435), 1047–1061.
- Jonsbråten, T. W., Wets, R. J., & Woodruff, D. L. (1998). A class of stochastic programs with decision dependent random elements. Annals of Operations Research, 82(0), 83–106.
- Hart, W. E., Watson, J. P., & Woodruff, D. L. (2011). Pyomo: modeling and solving mathematical programs in Python. Mathematical Programming Computation, 3, 219–260.
- Watson, J. P., & Woodruff, D. L. (2011). Progressive hedging innovations for a class of stochastic mixed-integer resource allocation problems. Computational Management Science, 8, 355–370.
- Chen, X., & Woodruff, D. L. (2024). Distributions and bootstrap for data-based stochastic programming. Computational Management Science, 21(1), 33.
