= Kanban =

Japanese business method

- Kanban maintains inventory levels; a signal is sent to produce and deliver a new shipment as material is consumed. These signals are tracked through the replenishment cycle and bring extraordinary visibility to suppliers and buyers.
- Purpose: Logistic control system
- Developer: Taiichi Ohno
- Implemented at: Toyota

Kanban (Japanese: かんばん [kambaɴ] meaning signboard) is a scheduling system for lean manufacturing (also called just-in-time manufacturing, abbreviated JIT). Taiichi Ohno, an industrial engineer at Toyota, developed kanban to improve manufacturing efficiency. The system takes its name from the cards that track production within a factory. Kanban is also known as the Toyota nameplate system in the automotive industry.

A goal of the kanban system is to limit the buildup of excess inventory at any point in production. Limits on the number of items waiting at supply points are established and then reduced as inefficiencies are identified and removed. Whenever a limit is exceeded, this points to an inefficiency that should be addressed.

In kanban, problem areas are highlighted by measuring lead time and cycle time of the full process and process steps. One of the main benefits of kanban is to establish an upper limit to work in process (commonly referred to as "WIP") inventory to avoid overcapacity.

Other systems with similar effect exist, for example CONWIP. A systematic study of various configurations of kanban systems, such as generalized kanban or production authorization card (PAC) and extended kanban, of which CONWIP is an important special case, can be found in Tayur (1993), and more recently Liberopoulos and Dallery (2000), among other papers.

== Origins ==
The system originates from the simplest visual stock replenishment signaling system, an empty box. This was first developed in the UK factories producing Spitfires during the Second World War, and was known as the "two bin system". In the late 1940s, Toyota started studying supermarkets with the idea of applying shelf-stocking techniques to the factory floor. In a supermarket, customers generally retrieve what they need at the required time—no more, no less. Furthermore, the supermarket stocks only what it expects to sell in a given time, and customers take only what they need, because future supply is assured. This observation led Toyota to view a process as being a customer of one or more preceding processes and to view the preceding processes as a kind of store.

Kanban aligns inventory levels with actual consumption. A signal tells a supplier to produce and deliver a new shipment when a material is consumed. This signal is tracked through the replenishment cycle, bringing visibility to the supplier, consumer, and buyer.

Kanban uses the rate of demand to control the rate of production, passing demand from the end customer up through the chain of customer-store processes. In 1953, Toyota applied this logic in their main plant machine shop.

== Operation ==
A key indicator of the success of production scheduling based on demand, pushing, is the ability of the demand-forecast to create such a push. Kanban, by contrast, is part of an approach where the pull comes from demand and products are made to order. Re-supply or production is determined according to customer orders.

In contexts where supply time is lengthy and demand is difficult to forecast, often the best one can do is to respond quickly to observed demand. This situation is exactly what a kanban system accomplishes, in that it is used as a demand signal that immediately travels through the supply chain. This ensures that intermediate stock held in the supply chain are better managed, and are usually smaller. Where the supply response is not quick enough to meet actual demand fluctuations, thereby causing potential lost sales, a stock building may be deemed more appropriate and is achieved by placing more kanban in the system.

Taiichi Ohno stated that to be effective, kanban must follow strict rules of use. Toyota, for example, has six simple rules, and close monitoring of these rules is a never-ending task, thereby ensuring that the kanban does what is required.

=== Toyota's six rules ===
Toyota has formulated six rules for the application of kanban:

1. Each process issues requests (kanban) to its suppliers when it consumes its supplies.
2. Each process produces according to the quantity and sequence of incoming requests.
3. No items are made or transported without a request.
4. The request associated with an item is always attached to it.
5. Processes must not send out defective items, to ensure that the finished products will be defect-free.
6. Limiting the number of pending requests makes the process more sensitive and reveals inefficiencies.

=== Kanban (cards) ===
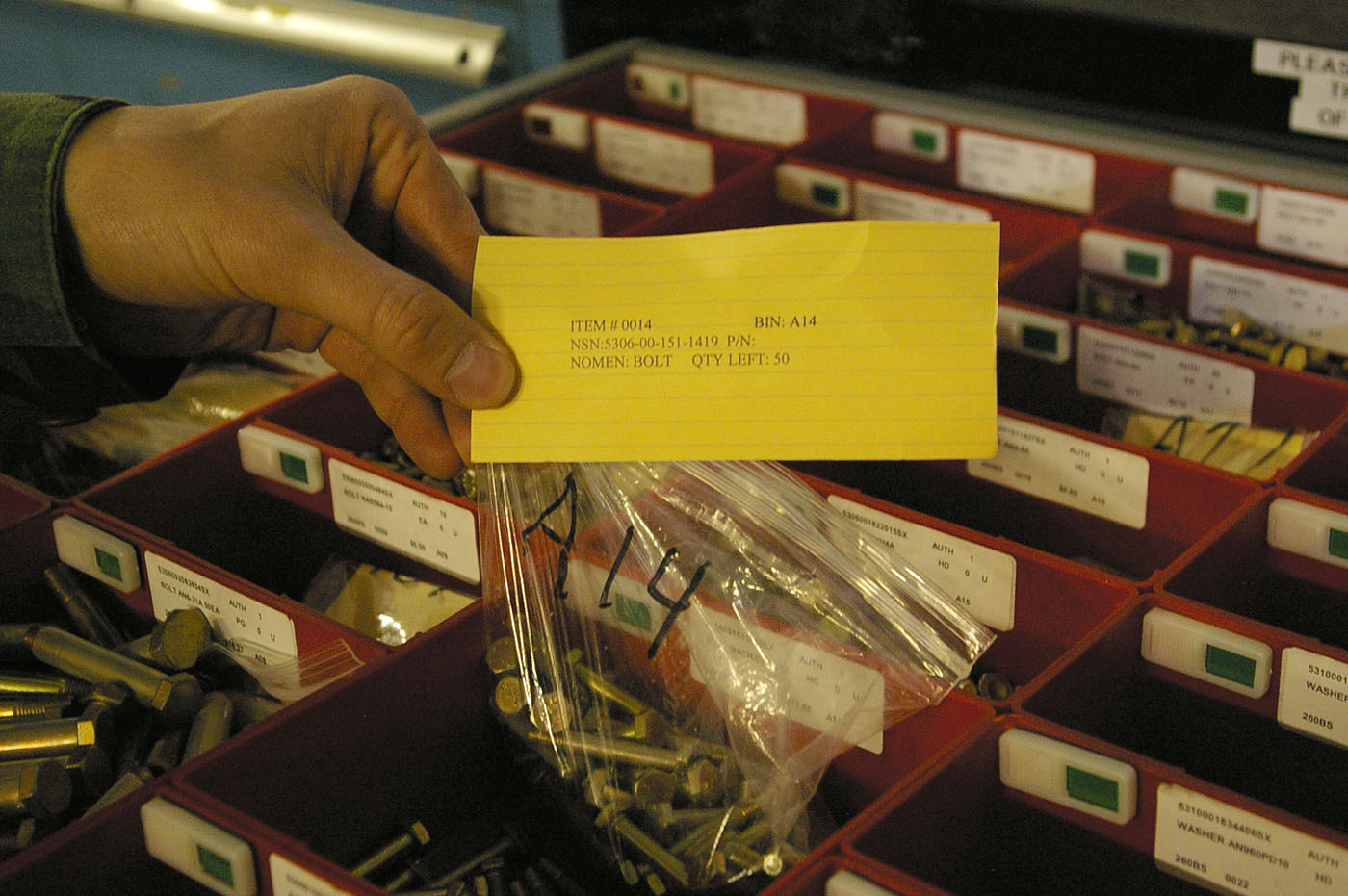
A Kanban card together with the bag of bolts that it refers to

Kanban cards are a key component of kanban and they signal the need to move materials within a production facility or to move materials from an outside supplier into the production facility. The kanban card is, in effect, a message that signals a depletion of product, parts, or inventory. When received, the kanban triggers replenishment of that product, part, or inventory. Consumption, therefore, drives demand for more production, and the kanban card signals demand for more product—so kanban cards help create a demand-driven system.

It is widely held by proponents of lean production and manufacturing that demand-driven systems lead to faster turnarounds in production and lower inventory levels, helping companies implementing such systems be more competitive.

In the last few years, systems sending kanban signals electronically have become more widespread. While this trend is leading to a reduction in the use of kanban cards in aggregate, it is still common in modern lean production facilities to find the use of kanban cards. In various software systems, kanban is used for signalling demand to suppliers through email notifications. When stock of a particular component is depleted by the quantity assigned on kanban card, a "kanban trigger" is created (which may be manual or automatic), a purchase order is released with predefined quantity for the supplier defined on the card, and the supplier is expected to dispatch material within a specified lead-time.

Kanban cards, in keeping with the principles of kanban, simply convey the need for more materials. A red card lying in an empty parts cart conveys that more parts are needed.

=== Three-bin system ===
An example of a simple kanban system implementation is a "three-bin system" for the supplied parts, where there is no in-house manufacturing. One bin is on the factory floor (the initial demand point), one bin is in the factory store (the inventory control point), and one bin is at the supplier. The bins usually have a removable card containing the product details and other relevant information, the classic kanban card.

When the bin on the factory floor is empty (because the parts in it were used up in a manufacturing process), the empty bin and its kanban card are returned to the factory store (the inventory control point). The factory store replaces the empty bin on the factory floor with the full bin from the factory store, which also contains a kanban card. The factory store sends the empty bin with its kanban card to the supplier. The supplier's full product bin, with its kanban card, is delivered to the factory store; the supplier keeps the empty bin. This is the final step in the process. Thus, the process never runs out of product—and could be described as a closed loop, in that it provides the exact amount required, with only one spare bin so there is never oversupply. This 'spare' bin allows for uncertainties in supply, use, and transport in the inventory system. A good kanban system calculates just enough kanban cards for each product. Most factories that use kanban use the colored board system (heijunka box).

== Electronic kanban ==
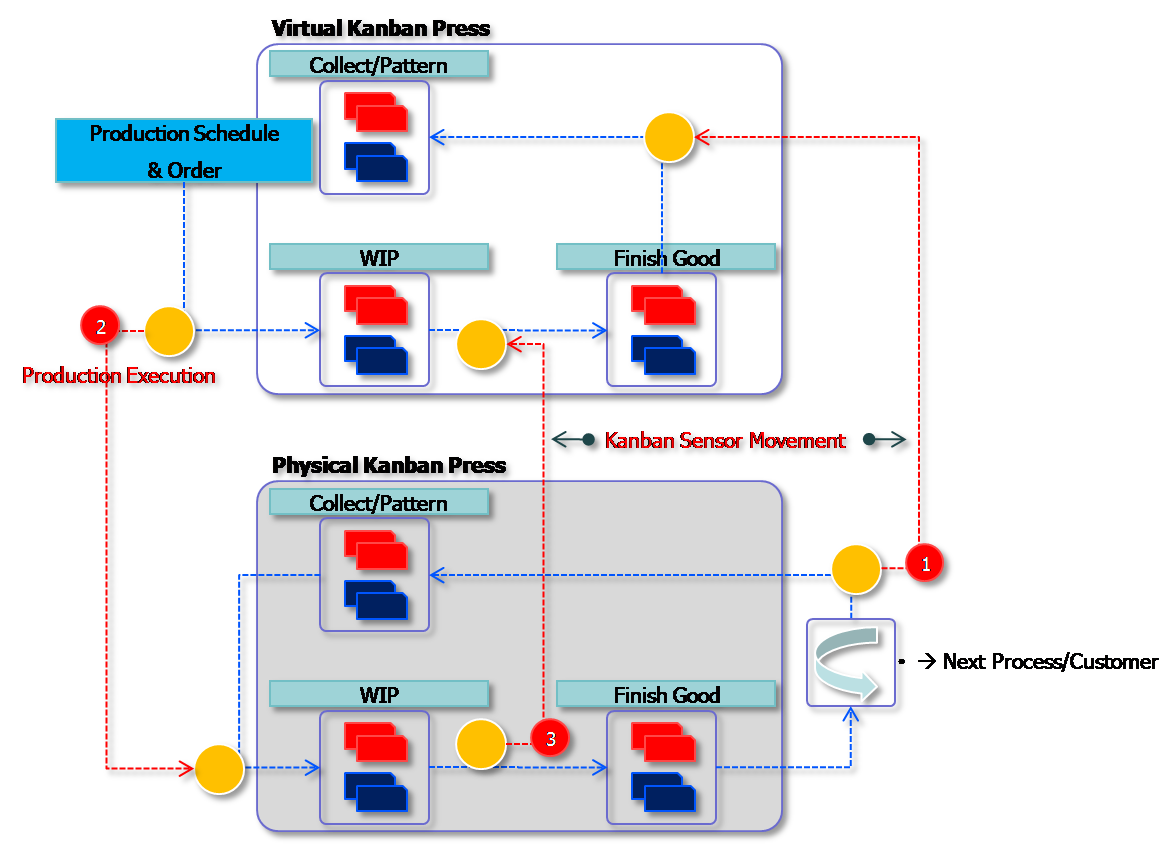
Virtual Kanban e-kanban system

Many manufacturers have implemented electronic kanban (sometimes referred to as e-kanban) systems. These help to eliminate common problems such as manual entry errors and lost cards. E-kanban systems can be integrated into enterprise resource planning (ERP) systems, enabling real-time demand signaling across the supply chain and improved visibility. Data pulled from e-kanban systems can be used to optimize inventory levels by better tracking supplier lead and replenishment times.

E-kanban is a signaling system that uses a mix of technology to trigger the movement of materials within a manufacturing or production facility. Electronic kanban differs from traditional kanban in using technology to replace traditional elements like kanban cards with barcodes and electronic messages like email or electronic data interchange.

A typical electronic kanban system marks inventory with barcodes, which workers scan at various stages of the manufacturing process to signal usage. The scans relay messages to internal/external stores to ensure the restocking of products. Electronic kanban often uses the Internet as a method of routing messages to external suppliers and as a means to allow a real-time view of inventory, via a portal, throughout the supply chain.

Organizations like the Ford Motor Company and Bombardier Aerospace have used electronic kanban systems to improve processes. Systems are now widespread from single solutions or bolt on modules to ERP systems.

== Types of kanban systems ==
In a kanban system, adjacent upstream and downstream workstations communicate with each other through their cards, where each container has a kanban associated with it. Economic order quantity is important. The two most important types of kanbans are:

- Production (P) Kanban: A P-kanban, when received, authorizes the workstation to produce a fixed amount of product. The P-kanban is carried on the containers that are associated with it.
- Transportation (T) Kanban: A T-kanban authorizes the transportation of the full container to the downstream workstation. The T-kanban is also carried on the containers that are associated with the transportation to move through the loop again.

The Kanban philosophy and task boards are also used in agile project management to coordinate tasks in project teams. An online demonstration can be seen in an agile simulator.

Implementation of kanban can be described in the following manner:

- The workflow consists of logical steps.
- There are two steps to a workflow viz. queue and work in progress/process.
- The team in charge decides on the maximum amount of work each step of the workflow can hold.
- Work is pushed into the queue step and pulled into the process step.
- If need be, work is halted in two successive stages to clear the bottleneck.

=== Kanbrain ===
A third type involves corporate training. Following the just-in-time principle, computer-based training permits those who need to learn a skill to do so when the need arises, rather than take courses and lose the effectiveness of what they've learned from lack of practice.

== See also ==
- Backflush accounting
- Continuous-flow manufacturing
- CONWIP
- Drum-buffer-rope
- Just-in-time manufacturing
- Kanban (development)
- Lean manufacturing
- Lean software development
- List of software development philosophies
- Manufacturing resource planning
- Material requirements planning
- Scheduling (production processes)
- Supply chain management
- Visual control
- Feedback
