= Counting point =

In logistics, a counting point (CP; also known as a status point, data acquisition point, check point, or control point) is a certain spot designated for planning, controlling, and monitoring material flow items (e.g. single parts, assembly groups, final products, bins, racks, containers, and freight carriers).

== Installation ==
If the production and material flow gets more and more complex then more counting points must be installed in the process of transport, shipping, and manufacturing. Especially check points for quality control and quality assurance can be used outstandingly as counting points but also data acquisition points in material handling processes. For better planning and monitoring of material flow items it is helpful to order all counting points in such a way that the requirements of an ideal Boolean interval (mathematics) algebra can be fulfilled. Boolean intervals are half-opened and a counting point lays always inside at the beginning and the ending lays outside and is the entry-point of the next-following interval. Such an interval can represent any kind of stretch in production and material flow e.g. an assembly line, a storage or warehouse, a transport route etc. Alternative production and transportation stretches are mapped as parallel intervals, which are logical equivalent but have their own different data acquisition points. If a flow item passes a certain CP it has left the preceding interval and stays in the concerned interval at the same time. By this it can be assured that a flow object can stay only in one interval at a certain moment which is also true and evident for parallel intervals. This kind of mapping material flow structure is necessary for a consistent calculation of the lead-time and complete cycle time for flow items which is extremely important not only for material flow planning but also for production planning and manufacturing operations management in general.

== Usage ==
Counting points are used in different logistic areas like transportation, material handling, goods receipt, and goods issue at the border of a plant, because this is often transfer of ownership. Other well-known counting points are receiving and issuing material items at the border of a storage or warehouse. Counting points play an important rule also in manufacturing and production scheduling and different concepts of material requirements planning (e.g. for the concept of cumulative quantities and the gross-net-method. Counting points also appear in the automotive industry where the production flow of a car is controlled, scheduled, and monitored continuously at exactly defined check points for different manufacturing departments and shops and where the data is used for scheduling and optimization.

== See also ==
- Supply chain management
- Cargo
- Material requirements planning
- Enterprise resource planning
- Operations management
- Production planning
- Data acquisition

== Literature ==
- Hans-Peter Wiendahl (1998), Fertigungsregelung – Logistische Beherrschung von Fertigungsabläufen auf Basis des Trichtermodells (in German), München Wien: Hanser, ISBN 3-446-19084-8
- Florian Klug (2010), Logistikmanagement in der Automobilindustrie (in German), Berlin: Springer, ISBN 978-3-642-05292-7
- J.T. Black (2000), Lean Manufacturing Implementation; published in: Encyclopedia of Production and Manufacturing Management, Boston Dordrecht London: Kluwer academics, pp. 346–352, ISBN 0-7923-8630-2
- Paul Schönsleben (2016), Integral Logistics Management: Operations and Supply Chain Management in Comprehensive Value-Added Networks (5th ed.), Boca Raton New York: Taylor and Francis Group, ISBN 9781498750530
