= Bill of resources =

List of resources, such as labor, needed to complete a saleable product

A bill of resources (BOR) describes a list of resources, such as labor, needed to complete a saleable product. It is used in capacity planning to prioritize and schedule work in manufacturing resource planning (MRP II) and enterprise resource planning (ERP) by highlighting critical resources. Critical resources are resources that are in short supply or that have long lead times.

The bill of resources complements the bill of materials (BOM), which lists physical sub-components of a product. Like a bill of materials, BORs are hierarchical with the top level representing the finished product or sub-assembly.

== See also ==
- Manufacturing resource planning (MRP II)
- Enterprise resource planning (ERP)
- Source reduction
