= Sandra Kurtzig =

American businesswoman and technology entrepreneur

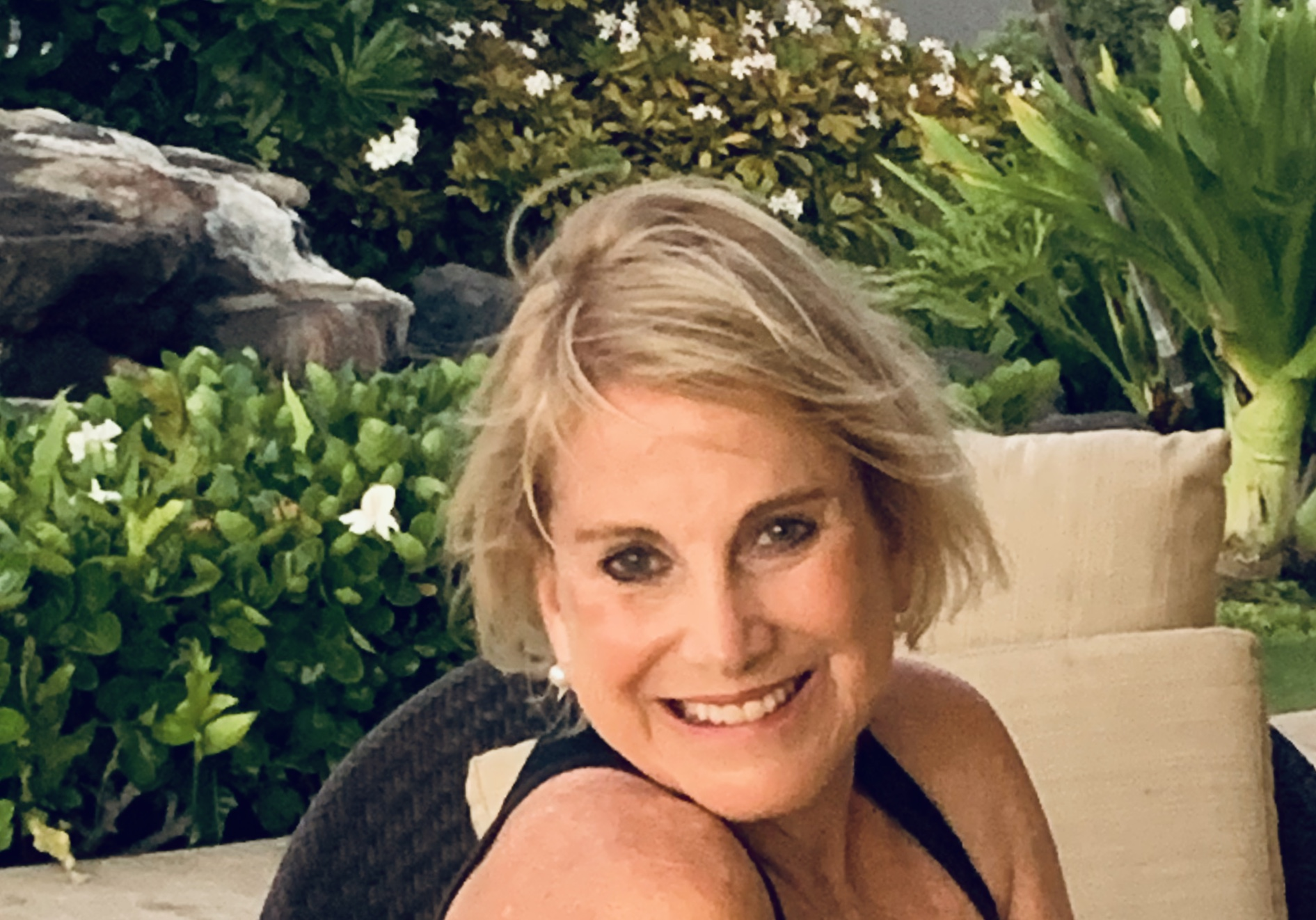
- Kurtzig in 2021
- Born: October 21, 1947 (age 78); Chicago, Illinois, U.S.
- Occupation: Businessperson
- Known for: Founder of ASK Group

Sandra L. Kurtzig is an American businesswoman and technology entrepreneur. She was one of Silicon Valley's first female entrepreneurs, and as the founder of the business and manufacturing software producer ASK Group in 1972, was the first woman to take a Silicon Valley technology company public.

== Career ==
=== Early life ===
Sandra Kurtzig was born in Chicago on October 21, 1947. Kurtzig earned a bachelor's degree in mathematics from University of California, Los Angeles in 1968, and a master's degree in aeronautical engineering at Stanford University.

=== Contract programming ===
In 1972, she left her job selling computer time-sharing for General Electric and devoted more of her time to starting a family. She founded ASK Group as a part-time job, using "a $2,000 commission check from GE;" the $2,000 was needed to rent a time-sharing terminal. Kurtzig launched ASK as a small, part-time contract software-programming business out of her second bedroom "to keep her mind occupied" and increase her income, never intending the business to operate outside her house. She was asked by her first client, Halcyon, to create an inventory-tracking program that could efficiently provide manufacturing information. Realizing that other manufacturers might find such a program useful, she recruited several graduates with degrees in engineering and computers. Under her direction they wrote standardized applications that addressed problems faced by local manufacturers.

=== ERP ===
==== ASK Computer Systems ====
Kurtzig reinvested all profits into growing the company. Her company required access to minicomputers and she persuaded employees at a nearby Hewlett-Packard plant to allow her company to use one of the company's HP 3000 minicomputers outside of normal working hours. By 1978, ASK released a package of programs called Manman, one of the first enterprise resource planning (ERP) software suites. She later concluded a deal for Hewlett Packard to sell Manman for use on HP-3000 minicomputers, at a time when most ERP software was only available to run on more expensive mainframe computers. The company went public on NASDAQ in 1981, and in 1983, Kurtzig's personal stake in the ASK Group was worth $67 million. She resigned from her role of CEO of the ASK Group in 1985. Kurtzig attributed her declining interest in the business to family pressures, along with other factors.

Divorced from her husband, Kurtzig devoted more time to raising her two sons, who were aged 12 and 9 at the time. In the meantime, Kurtzig had spent her time traveling, writing her autobiography, and investing in other technology companies, but this proved to be unfulfilling.

She returned in 1989 to refocus and once again grow the company. Kurtzig began to revamp the way her old company had been run, shifting organization and priorities to new products. She changed such minor but important details as the quality of the food and beer at the company's Friday evening celebrations in an effort to reconnect upper-level management with the company's employees. As part of this effort, Kurtzig instituted 360-degree reviews (where employees review bosses).

At its peak, in 1992 the company's annual sales were approximately $430 Million U.S. dollars.

==== Kenandy ====
In 2010 she founded the enterprise management software company Kenandy, where she served as the CEO through 2015 and is currently the Chairman. Kenandy specializes in producing cloud ERP solutions for manufacturing businesses. Kenandy is named after Kurtzig's sons, Ken and Andy Kurtzig, who are serving as CEOs at other tech businesses. In June 2013, Kenandy announced a $33 million round of funding led by Lightspeed Venture Partners. valuing the company at $350 million. Other investors are Kleiner Perkins Caufield and Byers, salesforce.com, and WSGR (Wilson, Sonsini, Goodrich and Rosati).

Kenandy was acquired by Rootstock Software on January 11, 2018.

== Personal ==
When Kurtzig was awarded the Wall Street Transcript's Bronze Award and was shortly thereafter "profiled in The Wall Street Journal, The New York Times, and The Washington Post," she said "It's fun to clip articles and send them to your mother, but ASK is really a team." Her former husband's name was Arie, and their sons Ken and Andy Kurtzig were born c. 1973 and 1976; their parents divorced when the boys were 12 and 9.

Her father's name was Barney Brody. Her mother "Marian (Boruck) Brody came from a wealthy Chicago family, graduated from the University of Illinois, and worked for a time as a police reporter in Chicago."

Kurtzig's autobiography, CEO: Building a $400 Million Company from the Ground Up was published by Harvard Business Press.

== See also ==
- Pearl.com (company founded by son Andy Kurtzig)
