= Joseph Orlicky =

American engineer, author, and manufacturing specialist

- Born: December 31, 1922
- Known for: Author of the first book on Material Requirements Planning

Joseph Orlicky (December 31, 1922 – December 1986) was a Czech-born American pioneer of computerized materials management, manufacturing specialist and author who created the Material requirements planning (MRP). He was the author of the first book on Material Requirements Planning in 1975.

Also known as Joe Orlicky, he was an engineer at IBM in 1964 when he constructed the first principles of MRP. As part of his research, he studied the Toyota Production System (TPS) which then became the basis of lean manufacturing.

His first book called The Successful Computer System: Its Planning, Development, and Management in a Business Enterprise, was published 1969. His second book, which sold more than 140,000 copies, called Material Requirements Planning: The New Way of Life in Production and Inventory Management, became the blueprint for the development of standardized MRP systems.

== See also ==
- Operations management
