= Push–pull strategy =

Business terminology

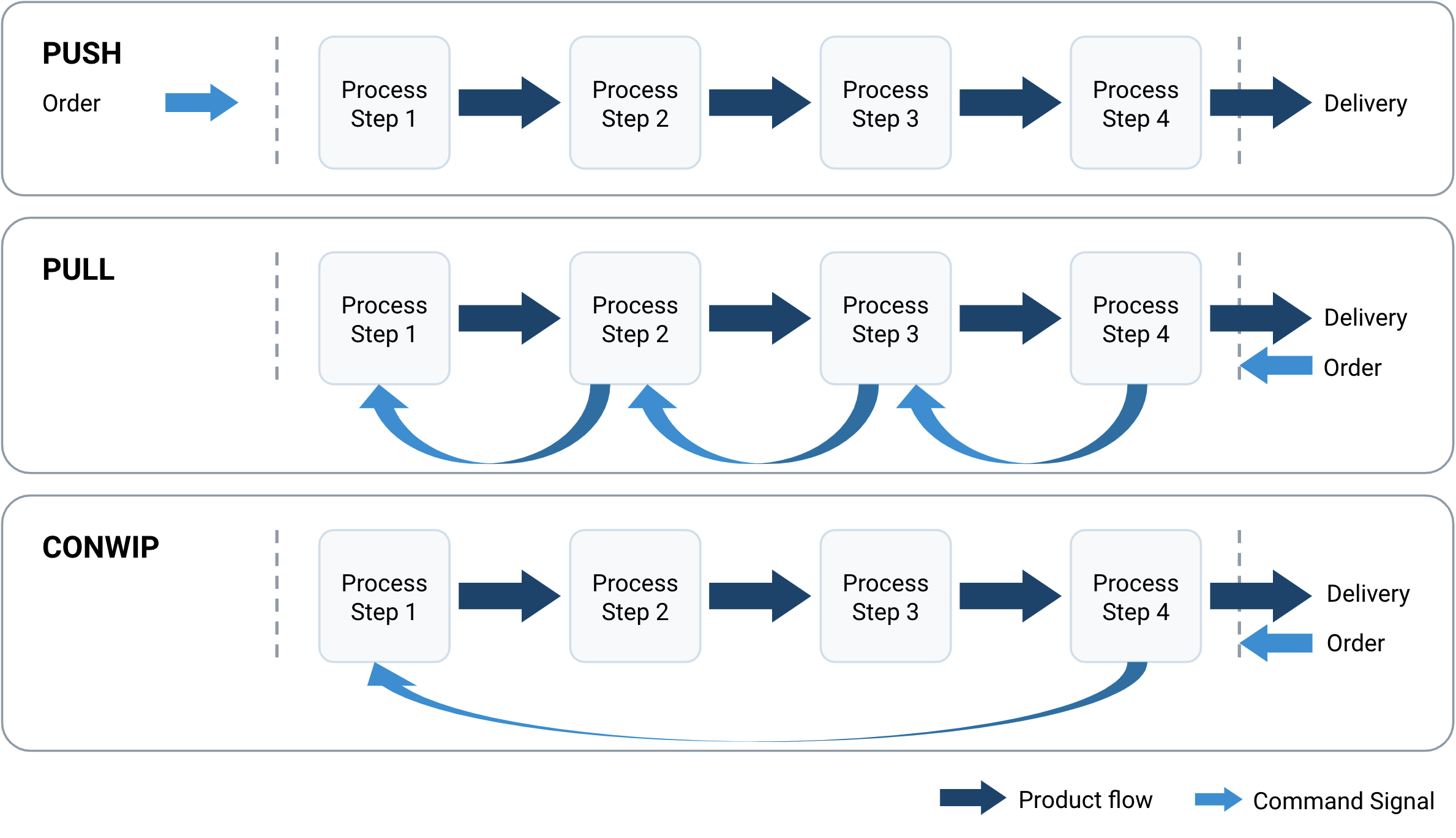
The original meaning of push and pull, as used in operations management, logistics and supply chain management. In the pull system production orders begin upon inventory reaching a certain level, while on the push system production begins based on demand (forecasted or actual demand). The CONWIP is a hybrid between a pure push and pure pull system.

In business strategy, push strategies generally involve producers acting in anticipation of consumer demand, while pull strategies involve producers acting in response to expressed demand. Push and pull strategies are widely used in logistics, supply chain management, and marketing.

== Supply-chain management ==
=== Complete definition ===
There are several definitions on the distinction between push and pull strategies. Liberopoulos (2013) identifies three such definitions:

1. A pull system initiates production as a reaction to present demand, while a push system initiates production in anticipation of future demand.
2. In a pull system, production is triggered by actual demands for finished products, while in a push system, production is initiated independently of demands.
3. A pull system is one that explicitly limits the amount of WIP (works in progress) that can be in the system, while a push system has no explicit limit on the amount of WIP that can be in the system.

Other definitions are:

- Push: As stated by Bonney et al. (1999) control information flow is in the same direction of goods flow
- Semi push or Push-pull : Succeeding node makes order request for preceding node. Preceding node reacts by replenishing from stock that is rebuilt every fixed period.
- Pull : Succeeding node makes order request for preceding node. Preceding node reacts by producing the order, which involves all internal operations, and replenishes when finished.
- Semi-pull or pull-push : Succeeding node makes order request for preceding node. Preceding node reacts by replenishing from stock that is rebuilt immediately. There are several levels of semi-pull systems as a node can have stock at several layers in an organization.

=== Information flow ===
With a push-based supply chain, products are pushed through the channel, from the production side up to the retailer. The manufacturer sets production at a level in accord with historical ordering patterns from retailers. It takes longer for a push-based supply chain to respond to changes in demand, which can result in overstocking or bottlenecks and delays (the bullwhip effect), unacceptable service levels and product obsolescence.

In a pull-based supply chain, procurement, production and distribution are demand-driven rather than to forecast. However, a pull strategy does not always require make to order production. Toyota Motors Manufacturing is frequently used as an example of pull production, yet do not typically produce to order. They follow the "supermarket model" where limited inventory is kept on hand and is replenished as it is consumed.

A supply chain is almost always a combination of both push and pull, where the interface between the push-based stages and the pull-based stages is sometimes known as the push–pull boundary. However, because of the subtle difference between pull production and make-to-order production, a more accurate name for this may be the customer order decoupling point. An example of this is Dell's build to order supply chain. Inventory levels of individual components are determined by forecasting general demand, but final assembly is in response to a specific customer request. The decoupling point would then be at the beginning of the assembly line.

=== Use of pull, push, and hybrid push-pull strategy ===
Harrison summarized when to use each one of the three supply chain strategies:

- A push based supply chain strategy is usually suggested for products with low demand uncertainty, as the forecast will provide a good indication of what to produce and keep in inventory, and also for products with high importance of economies of scale in reducing costs.
- A pull based supply chain strategy, usually suggested for products with high demand uncertainty and with low importance of economies of scales, which means, aggregation does not reduce cost, and hence, the firm would be willing to manage the supply chain based on realized demand.
- A hybrid push–pull strategy, usually suggested for products which uncertainty in demand is high, while economies of scale are important in reducing production and delivery costs. An example of this strategy is the furniture industry, where production strategy has to follow a pull-based strategy, since it is impossible to make production decisions based on long-term forecasts. However, the distribution strategy needs to take advantage of economies of scale in order to reduce transportation cost, using a push-based strategy.

=== Examples in push and pull ===
Hopp and Spearman consider some of the most common systems found in industry and the literature and classify them as either push or pull

- Material requirements planning (MRP) is a push system because releases are made according to a master production schedule without regard to system status. Hence, no prior work in process (WIP) limit exists.
- Classic kanban is a pull system. The number of kanban cards establishes a fixed limit on WIP.
- The classic base stock system is a push system because there is no limit on the amount of work in process in the system. This is because backorders can increase beyond the basestock level.
- Installation stock is also a push system as are echelon stock systems because neither imposes a limit on the number of orders in the system.
- CONstant work in process (CONWIP) is a pull system because it limits WIP via cards similar to kanban. An important difference from kanban from an implementation standpoint is that the cards are line specific rather than part number specific. However, from a push-pull perspective, CONWIP cards limit WIP in the same manner as kanban cards.
- (K, S) systems (proposed by Liberopoulos and Dallery) are pull systems if K <∞ and are push systems otherwise.
- POLCA systems proposed by Suri are pull systems because, like kanban and CONWIP, WIP is limited by cards.
- PAC systems proposed by Buzacott and Shanthikumar are pull systems when the number of process tags (which serve to limit WIP) is less than infinity.
- MRP with a WIP constraint (as suggested by Axsäter and Rosling) is a pull system.

Liberopoulos (2013) also classifies common systems according to different definitions on the distinction between push and pull.

== Marketing ==
An advertising push strategy refers to a situation when a vendor advertises its product to gain audience awareness, while the pull strategy implies the aims to reach audiences which have shown existing interest in the product or information about it.

=== Social pull marketing ===
The business terms push and pull originated in the logistic and supply chain management, but are also widely used in marketing.

Social pull marketing is the adaptation of the traditional push–pull strategy marketing concepts to social media websites. It utilizes the traditional "pull" concept for a new way of social media marketing. To get a basic understanding of what social pull marketing is, just think of people friending you rather than you friending people.

You or your company must create a need for someone to friend you or your company. That need could be information, electronic coupons, and other electronic items that people want, but that only your friends can get.

Facebook example:

If you own a small athletic shoe manufacturing company, your Facebook friends will receive a flow of information pertaining to the activities that your demographics would enjoy, such as marathon information, healthy eating, how to walk for exercise, or how to run or jog properly. Your Facebook friends would also receive special discounts via electronic coupons. By following this strategy, your Facebook friends are pre-qualified buyers.

Real-world experiment example:

Social pull marketing can be applied to all of the social media websites. "I would rather have 400 people who friended me, than 4,000 people that I friended. I would have 400 people who chose to be my friend; they are pre-qualified buyers. The 4,000 people I friended accepted my friend request only because I asked them and most likely will not pay attention to what I have to say on my social media website".

For this experiment, multiple RSS feeds for one topic (popular music) were used to generate one united RSS feed. The feed was sent through Twitter. For this experiment, no one actually tweeted; however, the test Twitter account now has over 400 followers in a few short months. This is proof that social pull marketing works. The people following the test Twitter account all chose to follow it, thereby building a list of Twitter followers who are interested in popular music.

== See also ==
- Supply and demand
- Digital marketing
- Publish/subscribe
- Issue tracking system
- Lean thinking
- Decision making
- Marketing strategy
- Marketing mix modeling
