= Capacity planning =

Determining production capacity needed for product demand

Capacity planning is the process of determining the production capacity needed by an organization to meet changing demands for its products. In the context of capacity planning, design capacity is the maximum amount of work that an organization or individual is capable of completing in a given period. Effective capacity is the maximum amount of work that an organization or individual is capable of completing in a given period due to constraints such as quality problems, delays, material handling, etc.

The phrase is also used in business computing and information technology as a synonym for capacity management. IT capacity planning involves estimating the storage, computer hardware, software and connection infrastructure resources required over some future period of time. A common concern of enterprises is whether the required resources are in place to handle an increase in users or number of interactions. Capacity management is concerned about adding central processing units (CPUs), memory and storage to a physical or virtual server. This has been the traditional and vertical way of scaling up web applications, however IT capacity planning has been developed with the goal of forecasting the requirements for this vertical scaling approach.

A discrepancy between the capacity of an organization and the demands of its customers results in inefficiency, either in under-utilized resources or unfulfilled customer demand. The goal of capacity planning is to minimize this discrepancy. Demand for an organization's capacity varies based on changes in production output, such as increasing or decreasing the production quantity of an existing product, or producing new products. Better utilization of existing capacity can be accomplished through improvements in overall equipment effectiveness (OEE). Capacity can be increased through introducing new techniques, equipment and materials, increasing the number of workers or machines, increasing the number of shifts, or acquiring additional production facilities.

Capacity is calculated as (number of machines or workers) × (number of shifts) × (utilization) × (efficiency).

== Assets ==
There are three primary categories of assets that concern capacity planning:

- People - Ensuring enough and sufficiently trained personnel to support business operations.
- Technology - Determining and acquiring hardware, software, and networking resources to achieve optimal performance, minimal bottleneck, and high availability.
- Infrastructure - Ensuring physical facilities meet the needs of the business environment.

They must all account both for current capacity as well as possible future scaling.

== Strategies ==
The broad classes of capacity planning are lead strategy, lag strategy, match strategy, and adjustment strategy.

- Lead strategy is adding capacity according to the increasing demand. Lead strategy is an aggressive strategy with the goal of luring customers away from the company's competitors by improving the service level and reducing lead time. It is also a strategy aimed at reducing stockout costs. A large capacity does not necessarily imply high inventory levels, but it can imply higher cycle stock costs. Excess capacity can also be rented to other companies.

Advantage of lead strategy: First, it ensures that the organization has adequate capacity to meet all demand, even during periods of high growth. This is especially important when the availability of a product or service is crucial, as in the case of emergency care or hot new product. For many new products, being late to market can mean the difference between success and failure. Another advantage of a lead capacity strategy is that it can be used to preempt competitors who might be planning to expand their own capacity. Being the first in an area to open a large grocery or home improvement store gives a retailer a define edge. Finally many businesses find that overbuilding in anticipation of increased usage is cheaper and less disruptive than constantly making small increases in capacity. Of course, a lead capacity strategy can be very risky, particularly if demand is unpredictable or technology is evolving rapidly.

- Lag strategy refers to adding capacity only after the organization is running at full capacity or beyond due to increase in demand (North Carolina State University, 2006). This is a more conservative strategy and opposite of a lead capacity strategy. It decreases the risk of waste, but it may result in the loss of possible customers either by stockout or low service levels. Three clear advantages of this strategy are a reduced risk of overbuilding, greater productivity due to higher utilization levels, and the ability to put off large investments as long as possible. Organization that follow this strategy often provide mature, cost-sensitive products or services.
- Match strategy is adding capacity in small amounts in response to changing demand in the market. This is a more moderate strategy.
- Adjustment strategy is adding or reducing capacity in small or large amounts due to consumer's demand, or, due to major changes to product or system architecture.

=== Time-scale ===
One simple model distinguishes between short-, mid-, and long-term capacity planning (operational, tactical, and strategical, respectively). These range from a few days to many years in the future.

== Measurement ==
In the context of systems engineering, capacity planning is used during system design and system performance monitoring....

Capacity planning is long-term decision that establishes a firm's overall level resources. It extends over a time horizon long enough to obtain resources. Capacity decisions affect the production lead time, customer responsiveness, operating cost and company ability to compete. Inadequate capacity planning can lead to the loss of the customer and business. Excess capacity can drain the company's resources and prevent investments into more lucrative ventures. The question of when capacity should be increased and by how much are the critical decisions. Failure to make these decisions correctly can be especially damaging to the overall performance when time delays are present in the system.

=== Capacity – available or required? ===
From a scheduling perspective it is very easy to determine how much capacity (or time) will be required to manufacture a quantity of parts. Simply multiply the standard cycle time by the number of parts and divide by the part or process OEE %.

If production is scheduled to produce 500 pieces of product A on a machine having a cycle time of 30 seconds and the OEE for the process is 85%, then the time to produce the parts would be calculated as follows:

(500 parts × 30 seconds) / 85% = 17647.1 seconds The OEE index makes it easy to determine whether we have ample capacity to run the required production. In this example 4.2 hours at standard versus 4.9 hours based on the OEE index.

By repeating this process for all the parts that run through a given machine, it is possible to determine the total capacity required to run production.

=== Capacity available ===
When considering new work for a piece of equipment or machinery, knowing how much capacity is available to run the work will eventually become part of the overall process. Typically, an annual forecast is used to determine how many hours per year are required. To calculate the total capacity available, the volume is adjusted according to the period being considered. The available capacity is the difference between the required capacity and planned operating capacity.

Capacity is needed in formulation and execution of strategy as this refers to how capable are the resources in the organization. Without effective resources it could be very difficult to formulate and implement the Strategy.

== See also ==
- Bill of resources
- Capacity management
- Enterprise resource planning (ERP)
- Manufacturing resource planning (MRP II)
- Overall equipment effectiveness (OEE)
- Resource allocation

== Bibliography ==
- Hill, Joyce (2006). Capacity Requirements Planning.
- Krajewski, Lee J.; Ritzman, Larry P. (2005). Operations Management: Processes and Value Chains. Upper Saddle River, New Jersey: Prentice Hall.
- Lazowska, Edward D. (1984). Quantitative System Performance. Prentice-Hall. ISBN 978-0-13-746975-8.
