= Checkpoint (rapid HIV testing facility) =

First rapid HIV testing facility in the Netherlands

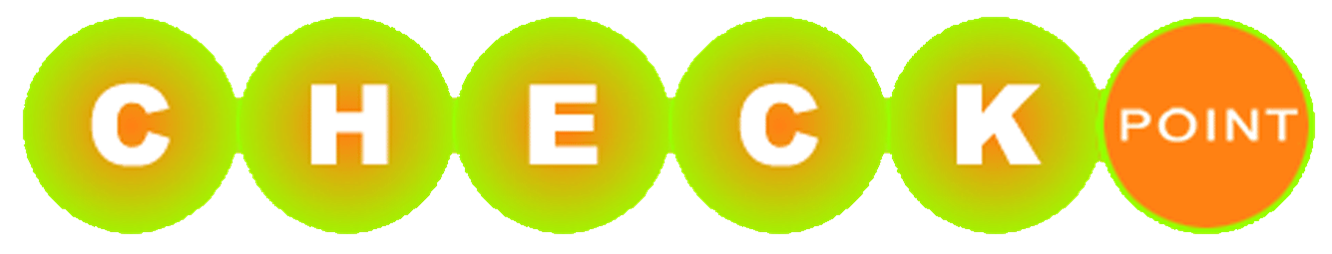
- Checkpoint Amsterdam logo
- Founded: 21 June 2002
- Dissolved: 27 June 2008
- Type: Rapid HIV testing project
- Location: Amsterdam, Netherlands
- Services: Rapid HIV testing; Pre-test and post-test counselling; Hepatitis A and hepatitis B vaccination
- Method: Determine HIV-1/2 rapid test
- Funding: GlaxoSmithKline
- Remarks: Nearly 5,000 people were tested during the project's operation

Checkpoint was a volunteer-run rapid HIV testing project in Amsterdam, the Netherlands, operating from 21 June 2002 until 27 June 2008. It was established to lower barriers to HIV testing by offering rapid tests with pre- and post-test counselling, providing results within 15 to 20 minutes at a time when conventional testing could require a wait of one to two weeks. Nearly 5,000 HIV tests were performed at the facility. Checkpoint's experience contributed to the wider introduction of rapid HIV testing in the Netherlands, and the project was closed after rapid testing had become more widely available.

== Background ==
Research conducted in the Netherlands in 2000 found that only 42% of men who have sex with men (MSM) had ever been tested for HIV. To lower the threshold for testing among this group, the Dutch HIV Association (HVN) sought to speed up testing.GlaxoSmithKline provided financial support.

== Principles ==
The initiative was guided by three core principles:

1. Rapid HIV testing was to be available to anyone who had incurred a risk of HIV infection, regardless of gender or sexual orientation.
2. The testing procedure was required to include comprehensive pre-test and post-test counselling.
3. Knowledge gained through the programme was to be systematically analysed and disseminated.

== History ==
=== Initial concerns ===
The introduction of rapid HIV testing in the Netherlands was initially accompanied by concerns about the reliability of rapid tests, the need for confirmatory testing after a reactive result, and the implications for pre- and post-test counselling.

Checkpoint used the Determine HIV-1/2 rapid antibody test. A Dutch evaluation of 1,160 patients found a sensitivity of 99.4% and a specificity of 99.6%, with results available after 15 minutes. Reactive results required confirmatory laboratory testing before an HIV diagnosis could be established.

The introduction of rapid testing also raised questions about counselling and whether receiving the result during the same visit might affect the preventive value of the testing procedure. Similar issues were considered when the Municipal Health Service in Rotterdam piloted rapid HIV testing. Its evaluation found that clients particularly valued the elimination of the one-week waiting period and that the test could be integrated into routine practice.

The Rotterdam study concluded that rapid testing made HIV testing more accessible, although the rapid test alone did not attract clients who had taken greater risks or more people from high-risk groups. Following the pilot, the Rotterdam Municipal Health Service decided to introduce rapid HIV testing into its regular HIV testing programme.

=== Results ===
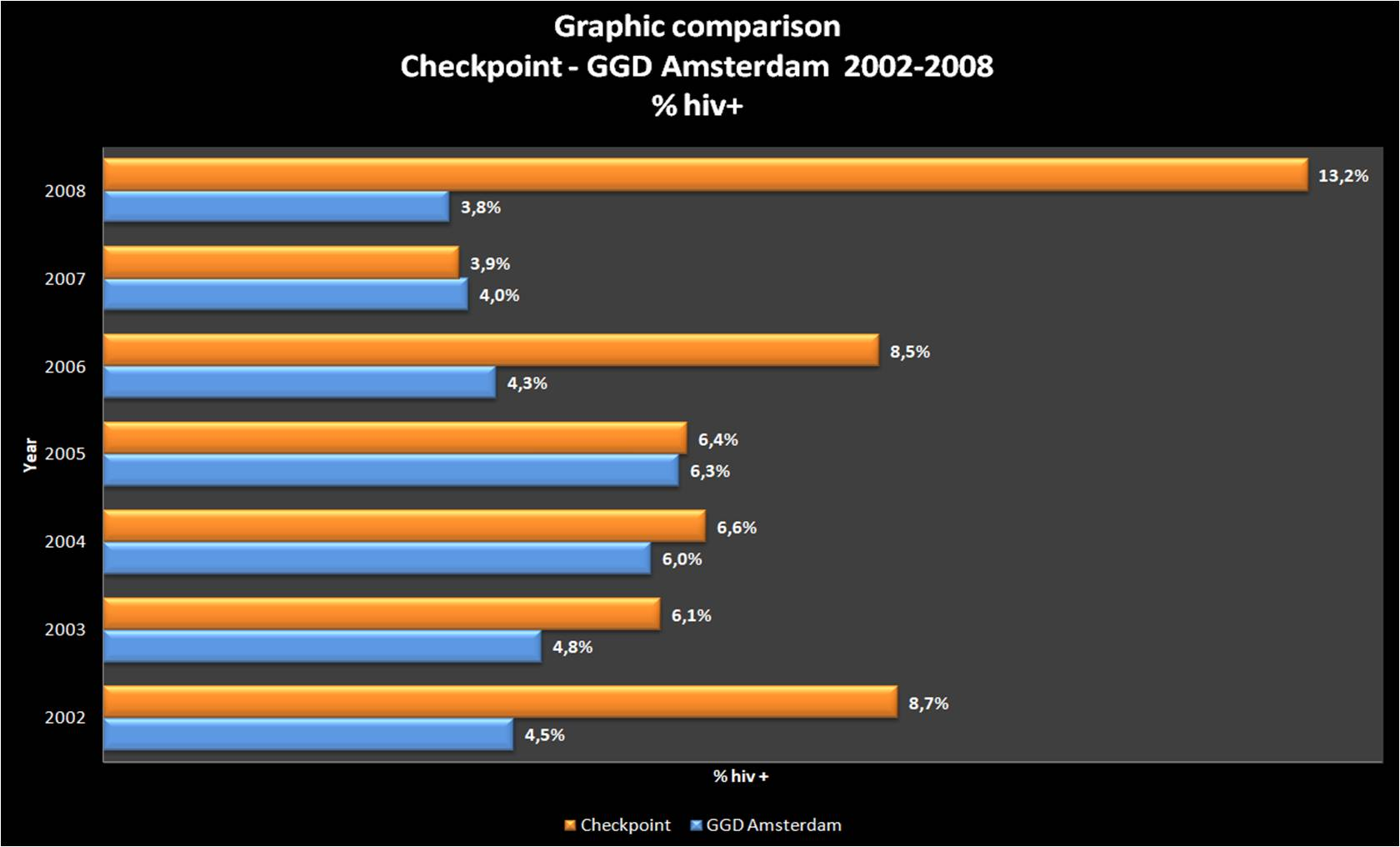
Graphic comparison %hiv+ Checkpoint vs. GGD STI Clinic Amsterdam 2002–2008

During its six years of operation, Checkpoint performed nearly 5,000 rapid HIV tests, of which 145 produced a positive result.

Results presented at the 15th International AIDS Conference in 2004 showed that demand for the service was high: 1,455 tests were performed during its first 18 months, and 67% of clients reported the speed of testing as their main reason for choosing Checkpoint. During this period, HIV prevalence among all Checkpoint clients was 2.8%, compared with 1.1% among clients tested by the Amsterdam Municipal Health Service; among men who have sex with men (MSM), the corresponding figures were 5.2% and 3.8%.

These early findings indicated that the rapid-testing service was reaching people with a comparatively high likelihood of an HIV diagnosis, particularly among MSM. The 2.8% overall HIV prevalence and 5.2% prevalence among MSM reported for Checkpoint in 2002–2003 were subsequently cited in a peer-reviewed study of community-based HIV testing services in Switzerland.

=== Recognition ===
Recognition came in 2004 when, at the 15th World AIDS Conference in Bangkok, Checkpoint demonstrated that the rapid HIV test in the Netherlands lowered the threshold for MSM to have themselves tested, which meant that one of Checkpoint's aims had been realized.

As of 2005, the Amsterdam City Council's public health service (the GGD) started offering rapid HIV tests to high-risk visitors to the STD outpatient clinic.

In 2006 the RIVM (Netherlands National Institute for Public Health and the Environment) advised the Ministry of Health to encourage the use of rapid HIV testing, to identify all obstacles to this, and to eliminate these obstacles.

=== Closedown ===
When 60% of the local health authorities appeared to be using rapid HIV testing as part of their standard screening method or were busy implementing it, this project could be successfully wound up. During a large farewell event on 27 June 2008, the then Mayor of Amsterdam, Job Cohen, thanked all volunteers for their results.

=== Sharing learning internationally ===
After its closure in 2008, Checkpoint Amsterdam continued for another year to support rapid HIV testing initiatives abroad and made its project documentation available digitally. The Checkpoint model subsequently spread across Europe, where community-based testing centres using the name were established in numerous cities.

The model developed beyond rapid HIV testing. A 2017 mapping study of European Checkpoints found that many centres had expanded their services to include testing for other sexually transmitted infections, counselling on drug use, vaccination and, in some cases, HIV treatment. The authors described the growth of these community-based services as a Europe-wide development originating with the

== Features of the project ==
Determine Hiv-1/2 Rapid Test

Checkpoint was designed as a low-threshold, community-based HIV testing service. Testing was available outside regular office hours and could be anonymous. The service was open to anyone who had been at risk of HIV infection, although particular attention was given to groups at increased risk.

Each consultation combined rapid testing with pre- and post-test counselling. During the pre-test consultation, a trained volunteer discussed the client's risk of HIV infection, the window period and safer sex. A nurse or physician then performed the Determine HIV-1/2 rapid test, with the result communicated approximately 15 minutes later.

Clients with a non-reactive result received post-test counselling and prevention advice. A reactive or inconclusive rapid-test result was followed by a blood sample for confirmatory laboratory testing. Clients with a reactive result could also receive peer support through the Marieke Bevelanderhuis, whose volunteers were themselves living with HIV.

Initially, clients could attend without an appointment, but increasing demand led Checkpoint to introduce an appointment system. When appointments were made, volunteers assessed whether the client had been at risk and whether testing was appropriate in relation to the window period. Checkpoint also offered hepatitis A and B vaccination to groups at risk.

== Volunteers ==
This project was run by volunteers. Once selected, volunteers followed an internal training programme, depending on their experience and duties, before being allowed to operate independently. In 2007 Checkpoint became the second voluntary organization in Amsterdam and the 25th in the Netherlands to receive the Goed Geregeld [well organized] award from the Dutch Association of Voluntary Organizations (NOV): an award reflecting the high quality achieved.

== Consultations and diagnoses ==
The following tables compare the number of tests and HIV diagnoses at Checkpoint and at the Amsterdam Public Health Service’s STI outpatient clinic. GGD Amsterdam refers to the local public health authority Gemeentelijke Gezondheidsdienst

Test site	Test/diagnosis	Group	2002	2003	2004	2005	2006	2007	2008
Checkpoint	HIV tests	MSM	213	477	531	438	360	397	174
Checkpoint	HIV tests	Heterosexual men	129	323	251	272	164	202	82
Checkpoint	HIV tests	Women	92	208	194	150	120	99	39
Checkpoint	HIV tests	Total	434	1,008	976	860	644	698	295
GGD Amsterdam	HIV tests	MSM	1,537	1,532	1,661	2,238	2,488	3,419	4,230
GGD Amsterdam	HIV tests	Heterosexual men	2,938	2,954	4,175	4,744	6,398	9,177	9,630
GGD Amsterdam	HIV tests	Women	3,415	3,626	5,039	5,564	7,712	11,340	11,760
GGD Amsterdam	HIV tests	Total	7,890	8,112	10,875	12,546	16,598	23,936	25,620
Checkpoint	HIV-positive results	MSM	14	21	21	26	23	11	14
Checkpoint	HIV-positive results	Heterosexual men	1	1	1	2	2	0	0
Checkpoint	HIV-positive results	Women	1	2	1	0	1	1	2
Checkpoint	HIV-positive results	Total	16	24	23	28	26	12	16
GGD Amsterdam	HIV-positive results	MSM	56	65	89	126	95	118	148
GGD Amsterdam	HIV-positive results	Heterosexual men	14	7	14	16	22	15	19
GGD Amsterdam	HIV-positive results	Women	12	15	17	21	18	29	11
GGD Amsterdam	HIV-positive results	Total	82	87	120	163	132	163	178
Checkpoint	HIV-positive (%)	MSM	6.6	4.4	4.0	5.9	6.4	2.8	8.0
Checkpoint	HIV-positive (%)	Heterosexual men	0.8	0.3	0.4	0.7	1.2	0.0	0.0
Checkpoint	HIV-positive (%)	Women	1.1	1.0	0.5	0.0	0.8	1.0	5.1
GGD Amsterdam	HIV-positive (%)	MSM	3.6	4.2	5.4	5.6	3.8	3.5	3.5
GGD Amsterdam	HIV-positive (%)	Heterosexual men	0.5	0.2	0.3	0.3	0.3	0.2	0.2
GGD Amsterdam	HIV-positive (%)	Women	0.4	0.4	0.3	0.4	0.2	0.3	0.1

In 2002 and 2008 Checkpoint was operational for 26 Friday evenings. For comparison, the corresponding results per group are given for the Amsterdam Public Health Service's STD Policlinic. More detailed results (Dutch language) are to be found in 6 jaar Checkpoint, een samenvatting [6 years of Checkpoint: a summary].

== Trials ==
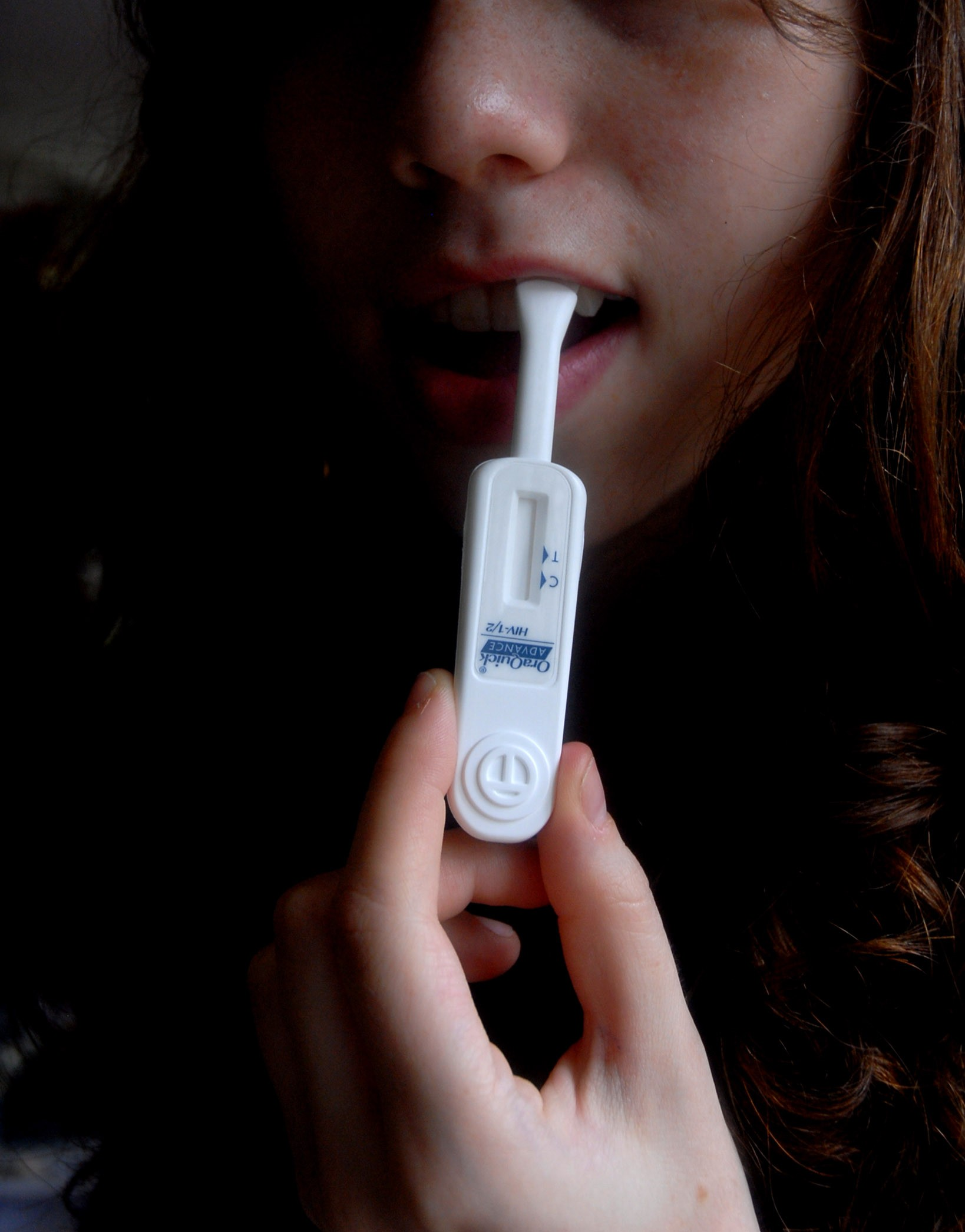
OraQuick Advance Hiv-1/2 Rapid Test

Detuned ELISA

Until early 2006 a Detuned ELISA test could still be requested in addition to a Western blot. This indicates whether the infections had occurred less than 6 months earlier or longer ago than this. It turned out that 63% of the infections were not recent.

General practitioners (family doctors)

Two general practitioners piloted rapid HIV testing in their practices. The pilot included 25 patients, some of whom had previously been reluctant to undergo conventional HIV testing because of the waiting time for results.

Mister B

Checkpoint also conducted rapid HIV testing sessions on Sunday afternoons at Mister B, a leather and fetish shop in Amsterdam. The pilot was intended to reach MSM who frequented the city's leather scene and who might not otherwise use conventional HIV testing services.

A total of 54 people were tested during the pilot, of whom three received a positive HIV test result, corresponding to an HIV positivity of 5.6%. The project did not demonstrate that testing at the shop was more effective in reaching leather-bar visitors, but the service attracted some clients from outside Amsterdam and clients reporting substantial sexual risk-taking and recreational drug use.

Oral fluid

In collaboration with OraSure a pilot was conducted with 1000 OraQuick ADVANCE® Rapid HIV-1/2 oral fluid tests. Initially this appeared to form the ideal HIV self-test, but during this pilot two false-negative outcomes were discovered. In a slightly smaller-scale pilot in London a false-negative was noted on three occasions.
