= Kenandy =

Software family, ERP/Enterprise Resource Management

Kenandy Inc.
- Industry: Enterprise resource planning; Cloud computing
- Founded: 2010
- Founder: Sandra Kurtzig
- Headquarters: San Ramon, California, USA
- Area served: North America
- Owner: Rootstock Software

Kenandy is a Rootstock Software company, is an American business-to-business software provider founded by tech entrepreneur Sandra Kurtzig. Kenandy is a vendor to combine quote to cash and enterprise resource planning in a single cloud computing solution. Kenandy is also a full-function enterprise resource planning vendor that runs native on the Salesforce.com App Cloud.

Kenandy allows businesses to collect, store, manage and interpret data on product planning, manufacturing, delivery, financial reporting, general ledger, marketing and sales. The company combines manufacturing software with cloud computing and social media and is able to orchestrate SAP SE, Salesforce, and other functionality.

== History ==
Kenandy's founder Sandra Kurtzig set up the company in Redwood City, California, in 2010 and named it after her sons Ken and Andy. It was Salesforce's first cloud ERP application. The company raised $10.5 million in August 2011 in a first round of funding led by Kleiner Perkins Caufield & Byers. Other investors included Salesforce.com and Wilson Sonsini Goodrich & Rosati. Kurtzig announced in September 2015 she would step down as CEO with Chuck Berger being her successor.

Kenandy raised another $11.5 million in a Series B funding in March 2016 from its previous investors and Lightspeed Venture Partners. The total funds raised by the company (including the first close on the Series B round in 2013) amount to $55 million.

Kenandy was acquired by Rootstock Software on January 11, 2018.
