= Payroll =

Record of money paid or due to employees

Handling payroll typically involves sending out payslips to employees.

A payroll is a list of employees of a company who are entitled to compensation and other work benefits, along with the amounts each should receive. The term can also refer to a company's records of past employee payments, including wages, salaries, bonuses, and withheld taxes, or to the department responsible for managing compensation. A company may handle all aspects of the payroll process in-house or can outsource aspects to a payroll processing company.

Payroll in the U.S. is subject to federal, state and local regulations including employee exemptions, record keeping, and tax requirements.

In recent years, there has been a significant shift towards cloud-based payroll solutions. These platforms offer advantages such as cost savings, scalability, and real-time data access, making them increasingly popular among businesses of all sizes. According to a report by USD Analytics, the global cloud-based payroll software market is projected to grow from $10.8 billion in 2023 to $20.5 billion by 2030, reflecting a compound annual growth rate (CAGR) of 9.6%.

== Frequency ==
Companies typically process payroll at regular intervals. This interval varies from company to company and may differ within the company for different types of employee.

According to research conducted in February 2022 by the U.S. Department of Labor and the Bureau of Labor Statistics, the four most common pay frequencies in the United States were:

- Weekly — 31.8% — Fifty-two 40-hour pay periods per year and include one 40 hour work week for overtime calculations.
- Biweekly — 45.7% — Twenty-six 80-hour pay periods per year, consisting of two 40 hour work weeks for overtime calculations.
- Semi-monthly — 18.0% — Twenty-four pay periods per year with two pay dates per month. Compensation is commonly paid on either the 1st and the 15th day of the month or the 15th and the last day of the month and consists of 86.67 hours per pay period.
- Monthly — 4.4% — Twelve pay periods per year with a monthly payment date. Each monthly payroll consists of 173.33 hours.

This frequency changes based on the establishment size, or the maximum number of employees within the business over the previous 12 months.

Frequency of pay periods by size class in the CES survey, February 2022
Size	Weekly	Biweekly	Semimonthly	Monthly
1-9	31.1%	36.0%	23.0%	10.0%
10-19	33.4%	45.9%	20.1%	0.6%
20-49	40.5%	44.1%	13.4%	2.1%
50-99	29.7%	54.4%	14.7%	1.2%
100-249	29.3%	56.4%	12.8%	1.5%
250-499	23.8%	64.0%	12.0%	0.3%
500-999	22.8%	63.9%	12.8%	0.5%
1000+	21.6%	67.6%	9.8%	0.9%

== Components ==
=== Gross pay ===
Gross pay, also known as gross income, is the total payment that an employee earns before any deductions or taxes are taken out. For employees that are hourly, gross pay is calculated when the rate of hourly pay is multiplied by the total number of regular hours worked. If the employee has overtime hours, these are multiplied by the overtime rate of pay, and the two amounts are added together. Also included in gross pay is any other type of earnings that an employee may have. These may include holiday pay, vacation or sick pay, bonuses, and any miscellaneous pay that the employee may receive.

=== Deductions ===
There are a wide array of voluntary deductions that can be taken out of an employee's gross pay, some of which are taken out before taxes and some being taken out after taxes. Pre-tax deductions are deductions that are taken out of an employee's gross pay amount before it is subject to tax. and could include health, dental, or life insurance, deductions for certain retirement accounts, or deductions for FSA or HSA accounts.

After-tax deductions are deductions that are occur after taxes have been taken out of an employee's pay.

=== Reimbursements ===
Payroll components may include reimbursements for some expenses that an employee bears on behalf of the company. In many cases this helps an employee save taxes. An employee typically has to submit some bills to validate the actual amounts. This has to then be approved typically by their manager and finance team. Some common reimbursement components in Indian payroll include telephone bills, driver salary and fuel reimbursements.

=== Taxes ===
Various levels of government require employers to withhold various types of income tax and payroll tax. In the United States, payroll taxes are used to support Social Security and Medicare costs while income taxes are used for other federal and state programs. In Canada, payroll taxes are used to support the government's Pension Plan (CPP or QPP) and Employment Insurance program (EI) while income taxes are used to fund public healthcare and other federal and province/territory programs.

=== Wage garnishments ===
A wage garnishment is a court-ordered method of collecting overdue debts that require employers to withhold money from employee wages and then send it directly to the creditor. Wage garnishments are post-tax deductions, meaning that these mandatory withholdings do not lower an employee's taxable income. Unpaid debts that may result in wage garnishments include credit card bills and medical bills, child support and alimony, federal student loans, and tax levies. Each of these garnishments may have different limit on the amount that may be deducted.

=== Net pay ===
Net pay is the total amount that an employee receives after all required and voluntary deductions are taken out.

== Outsourcing ==
Businesses may decide to outsource their payroll functions to an outsourcing service like a Payroll service bureau or a fully managed payroll service. These can normally reduce the costs involved in having payroll trained employees in-house as well as the costs of systems and software needed to process a payroll. Where this may reduce the cost for some companies many will foot a bigger bill to outsource their payroll if they have a specially designed payroll program or payouts for their employees. In many countries, business payrolls are complicated in that taxes must be filed consistently and accurately to applicable regulatory agencies. For example, restaurant payrolls which typically include tip calculations, deductions, garnishments, and other variables, can be difficult to manage especially for new or small business owners. Another reason is that company leaders may lack the time to manage payroll tasks directly.

In the UK, payroll bureaus will deal with all HM Revenue & Customs inquiries and deal with employee's queries. Payroll bureaus also produce reports for the businesses' account department and payslips for the employees and can also make the payments to the employees if required. As of 6 April 2016, umbrella companies are no longer able to offset travel and subsistence expenses and if they do, they will be deemed liable to reimburse HMRC any tax relief obtained. Furthermore, recruitment companies and clients may be potentially liable for the unpaid tax.

Another reason many businesses outsource is because of the ever-increasing complexity of payroll legislation. Annual changes in tax codes, Pay as you earn (PAYE) and National Insurance bands, as well as statutory payments and deductions having to go through the payroll, often mean there is a lot to keep abreast of to maintain compliance with the current legislation.

On the other hand, businesses may also decide to utilize payroll software to supplement the efforts of a payroll accountant or office instead of hiring more payroll specialists or outsourcing to a payroll company. Payroll software bases its calculation on entered rate, approved data obtained from other integrated tools like the electronic Bundy clock, and other essential digital HR tools.

== See also ==
- Payroll automation
