= Distribution resource planning =

Distribution resource planning (DRP) is a method used in business administration for planning orders within a supply chain. DRP enables the user to set certain inventory control parameters (like a safety stock) and calculate the time-phased inventory requirements. This process is also commonly referred to as distribution requirements planning. it consolidates the demands for multiple locations of several distribution centers with the sources of supply.

DRP uses several variables:

- the required quantity of product needed at the beginning of a period
- the constrained quantity of product available at the beginning of a period
- the recommended order quantity at the beginning of a period
- the backordered demand at the end of a period
- the on-hand inventory at the end of a period

DRP needs the following information:

- the demand in a future period
- the scheduled receipts at the beginning of a period
- the on-hand inventory at the beginning of a period
- the safety stock requirement for a period

== See also ==
- Distribution (business)
- Document automation for supply chain and logistics
- Supply chain management
