= Payroll automation =

Use of computers to manage payroll services

Payroll automation refers to the use of computers to produce paychecks and manage benefit payments for a company or community. Often, payroll automation is integrated into the company's enterprise resource planning system that provides an overall view of the company's or community's finances; in addition to payroll, it can manage customer relationships, production, personnel resources, invoicing and accounting.

== Payroll activities ==
Payroll management consists of several stages and procedures that require expertise in financial administration, such as employment contract management. Payroll management performs the following tasks:

- Timekeeping: knowing hours worked, and when (to know when overtime pay applies)
- Calculating and paying wages, settlement of tax withholdings
- Delivery of wage calculations and certificates to the employees
- Compiling statistics for different authorities, and for the purposes of improving activities
- Drawing up employment contracts
- Providing regulatory reports to the tax agencies and insurance companies
- Calculating annual holidays
- Managing deductions for employee benefits

The travel costs and travel invoices from the employees are usually processed together with payroll.

== Methods ==
Payroll functions can be automated using software to facilitate the collection, organization and storage of all information required for payroll calculations and regulatory agency reportage requirements. If the payroll software is not purchased as part of a comprehensive business management system, it can usually be combined with the company's existing solutions for accounting, sales ledger, working hour management and recruiting. Information that has been captured in one part of the system can be used by other modules. Hours registered in the work management system, for example, are automatically transferred to the wage calculation system.

== Benefits ==
Effective payroll automation collects all relevant information in one place in electronic format, reducing mistakes by eliminating the need to synchronize and manage otherwise duplicate data sets.

Well planned, modern payroll software provides the following benefits:

- It considers collective labor agreements and employer-specific procedures and exceptions.
- It provides a breakdown of the allowances and other bases for wages in the report, with dedicated rows for each day, week and month.
- It automatically follows the legislated accounting and calculation rules in the calculation of annual holidays.
- It manages the drawing up, posting, archiving and reporting of travel invoices.
- When combined with work shift management software, it can utilize data concerning working hours, overtime, allowances, holidays and absences.

== Related concepts ==
- Robotic Process Automation (RPA)
- Onboarding Automation
