= CONWIP =

Pull-oriented production control systems

Constant work in process or CONWIP are pull-oriented production control systems. Such systems can be classified as pull and push systems (Spearman et al. 1990). In a push system, the production order is scheduled, and the material is pushed into the production line. In a pull system, the start of each product assembly process is triggered by the completion of another at the end of production line. This pull-variant is known for its ease of implementation.

CONWIP is a kind of single-stage kanban system and is also a hybrid push-pull system. While kanban systems maintain tighter control of system WIP through the individual cards at each workstation, CONWIP systems are easier to implement and adjust, since only one set of system cards is used to manage system WIP. CONWIP uses cards to control the number of WIPs. For example, no part is allowed to enter the system without a card (authority). After a finished part is completed at the last workstation, a card is transferred to the first workstation and a new part is pushed into the sequential process route. In their paper, Spearman et al. (1990) used a simulation to make a comparison among the CONWIP, kanban and push systems, and found that CONWIP systems can achieve a lower WIP level than kanban systems.

== Card control policy ==
In a CONWIP system, a card is shared by all kinds of products. However, Duenyas (1994) proposed a dedicated card control policy in CONWIP and he stated that this policy could perform as a multiple chain closed queuing network.

== See also ==
- Factory Physics
- Material requirements planning (MRP)
- Just-in-time manufacturing (JIT)
- Kanban
