= Material requirements planning =

Production planning, scheduling, and inventory control system

Material requirements planning (MRP) is a production planning, scheduling, and inventory control system used to manage manufacturing processes. Most MRP systems are software-based, but it is possible to conduct MRP by hand as well.

An MRP system is intended to simultaneously meet three objectives:

- Ensure raw materials are available for production and products are available for delivery to customers.
- Maintain the lowest possible material and product levels in store
- Plan manufacturing activities, delivery schedules and purchasing activities.

== History ==
Prior to MRP, and before computers dominated industry, reorder point (ROP)/reorder-quantity (ROQ) type methods like EOQ (economic order quantity) had been used in manufacturing and inventory management. MRP was computerized by the aero engine makers Rolls-Royce and General Electric in the early 1950s but not commercialized by them. It was then 'reinvented' to supply the Polaris program and then, in 1964, as a response to the Toyota Manufacturing Program, Joseph Orlicky developed material requirements planning (MRP).

Early MRP users in the 1960s and 1970s included Black & Decker, Twin Disc, Markem, Steelcase, and American Sterilizer. The first company was Black and Decker in 1964, with Dick Alban as project leader. Orlicky's 1975 book Material Requirements Planning has the subtitle The New Way of Life in Production and Inventory Management. By 1975, MRP was implemented in 700 companies. This number had grown to about 8,000 by 1981.

In 1983, Oliver Wight developed MRP into manufacturing resource planning (MRP II). In the 1980s, Joe Orlicky's MRP evolved into Oliver Wight's manufacturing resource planning (MRP II) which brings master scheduling, rough-cut capacity planning, capacity requirements planning, S&OP in 1983 and other concepts to classical MRP. By 1989, about one third of the software industry was MRP II software sold to American industry ($1.2 billion worth of software). MRP's appeal is greater financial improvement than other business software. While automating payroll reduces the need for payroll clerks but requires computer equipment and staff, Computerworld said in 1986 that "In companies getting the full benefits of MRP II, however, the return on investment averages 200%". While accounting software automates manual functions, MRP allows analyses of updated material requirements impossible without computers. By then a variety of MRP software was available for mainframes and minicomputers, such as ASK's Manman and IBM's MAPICS.

== See also ==
- Bullwhip effect
- Capacity requirements planning (CRP)
- Configurable BOM
- CONWIP
- DDMRP – Demand Driven Planner Certification
- Enterprise resource planning (ERP)
- Industrial engineering
- Just-in-time (JIT)
- Kanban
- Modular BOM
- Supply chain management
