= List of ERP software packages =

This is a list of notable enterprise resource planning (ERP) software. The first section is devoted to free and open-source software, and the second is for proprietary software.

== Free and open-source ERP software ==
Name	Platform technology	Software license	Description	Countries of origin	Last stable release date
Adaxa Suite	Java	GPL	Integrated ERP built on Adempiere/iDempiere	Australia	
Adempiere	Java	GPL	Began as a fork of Compiere	Worldwide	2023-01-25 (3.9.4)
Apache OFBiz	Java JavaScript FreeMarker Groovy XML	Apache License 2.0	Business solutions and applications framework from the Apache Software Foundation	Worldwide	2026-07-04 (24.09.07)
Compiere	Java	GPL/Commercial	An ERP and CRM for the Small and Medium-sized Enterprise (SME) in distribution, retail, service and manufacturing. Acquired by Consona Corporation in June 2010	United States	2010 (3.3.0)
Dolibarr	JavaScript, PHP, MySQL or PostgreSQL	GPLv3	Web application (LAMP-based system) to manage small and medium entities	Worldwide	2025-07 (v.21.0.2)
ERP5	Python, JavaScript, Zope, or MySQL	GPL	Based on unified model for mid to large size organisations	Worldwide	2014 (5.5)
ERPNext	Python, JavaScript, MariaDB	GPLv3	ERP for small and medium-sized businesses	India	2023-07-05 (14.29.1)
iDempiere	Java, PostgreSQL/Oracle	GPLv2	OSGI + Adempiere	Worldwide	2022-12 (10)
LedgerSMB	Perl, PostgreSQL	GPL	Double entry accounting and ERP system (2006 fork of SQL-Ledger)	Worldwide	2026-July (1.13.7)
metasfresh	Java, JavaScript, PostgreSQL 9.5	GPL, Commercial (cloud based)	Integrated ERP, began as a friendly fork of ADempiere	Worldwide	2022-03 (5.174)
Odoo	JavaScript, Python, PostgreSQL	LGPLv3/Commercial	A suite of business management software tools including CRM, e-commerce, billing, accounting, manufacturing, warehouse, project management, and inventory management. Renamed from OpenERP	Worldwide	2025-09 (19.0)
SplendidCRM	C#, Microsoft SQL	GNU AGPL	CRM based on Microsoft Stack (Microsoft IIS and Microsoft SQL Server)	United States	2005
SQL-Ledger	Perl, PostgreSQL	GPL	Double entry accounting and ERP system	Canada	2020-01 (3.2.9)
Tryton	Python, PostgreSQL, GTK+, JavaScript	GPLv3	Originally forked from TinyERP, cleaned-up code base with continuous update/migration path	Worldwide	2023-10 (7.0)

== Proprietary ERP vendors and software ==
- 1C Company – 1C:Enterprise
- 24SevenOffice – 24SevenOffice Start, Premium, Professional and Custom
- 3i Infotech – Orion ERP, Orion 11j, Orion 11s
- abas Software AG – abas ERP
- Acumatica – Acumatica Cloud ERP
- Baan – Baan ERP
- BatchMaster Software – BatchMaster ERP
- BPCS – Business Planning and Control System
- Cegid – Cegid XRP Enterprise, Cegid XRP Flex, Cegid Orli
- Consona Corporation – AXIS ERP, Intuitive ERP, Made2Manage ERP
- CGI Group – CGI Advantage
- Consona Corporation – Cimnet Systems, Compiere professional edition, Encompix ERP
- Ciright Systems – Ciright ERP
- Comarch - from the smallest to the biggest system: Comarch ERP XT, Comarch Optima, Comarch ERP Standard (Altum), Comarch ERP Enterprise (Semiramis)
- Deacom – DEACOM ERP
- Deltek – Costpoint
- Eclipse – Eclipse ERP
- Epicor - Epicor Kinetic ERP, Epicor iScala, Epicor Eagle, Prophet 21
- Erply – Retail ERP
- Exact Software – Globe Next, Exact Online
- FinancialForce – FinancialForce ERP
- Fishbowl – Fishbowl Inventory
- Fujitsu Glovia Inc. – GLOVIA G2
- Greentree International – Greentree Business Software
- HashMicro – HashMicro
- IFS AB - IFS Cloud
- Inductive Automation – Ignition MES, OEE Module
- Infor Global Solutions – Infor CloudSuite Financials, Infor LN, Infor M3, Infor CloudSuite Industrial (SyteLine), Infor VISUAL, Infor Distribution SX.e, Infor XA
- IQMS – EnterpriseIQ
- Jeeves Information Systems AB – Jeeves
- Kuali – ERP for higher education institutions
- Microsoft – Microsoft Dynamics (a product line of ERP and CRM applications), NAV-X
- Noguska Inc – NolaPro
- Open Systems Accounting Software – OSAS, TRAVERSE
- Oracle – Oracle Fusion Cloud, Oracle ERP Cloud, Oracle NetSuite, Oracle E-Business Suite, JD Edwards EnterpriseOne, JD Edwards World, PeopleSoft, Oracle Retail
- Panaya – Panaya CloudQuality Suite
- Planet Soho – SohoOS
- Plex Systems – Plex Online
- Pronto Software – Pronto Software
- QAD Inc – QAD Enterprise Applications (formerly MFG/Pro)
- Quintiq
- Ramco Systems – Ramco Enterprise Series 4.x, e.Applications, On Demand ERP
- Sage Group – Sage 100 (formerly Sage ERP MAS 90 and 200), Sage 300 (formerly Accpac), 500 ERP, Sage X3, Sage Intacct
- SAP – SAP ERP, SAP S/4HANA, SAP Business Suite, SAP Business ByDesign, SAP Business One, SAP Business All-in-One, mySAP
- Sescoi – MyWorkPLAN, WorkPLAN Enterprise
- Tally Solutions – Tally.ERP 9
- Tata Consultancy Services – iON
- TechnologyOne – TechnologyOne
- TopSolid — TopSolid’Erp
- TradeCard – TradeXpress
- Transtek – Compass ERP
- UFIDA – UFIDA NC, UFIDA ERP-U8 All-in-one, UFIDA U9
- Unit4 – Unit4 ERPx, Unit4 Financials by Coda
- Visma – Visma Business, Visma.net ERP, Visma Global
- Walker Interactive Systems – CARMS, CORE, AP/PO
- Wherefour – cloud-based manufacturing ERP and traceability system
- Workday, Inc. – Workday
- Works Applications – AI Works
- Xentral – Xentral ERP Software

== See also ==
- List of project management software
- ERP system selection methodology
- Comparison of accounting software
- Inventory
