= Dolibarr =

Open source software for accounting

Dolibarr ERP CRM
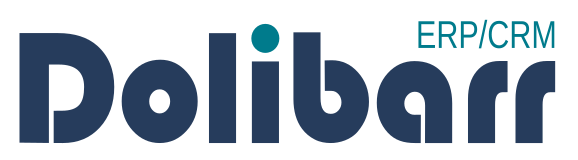

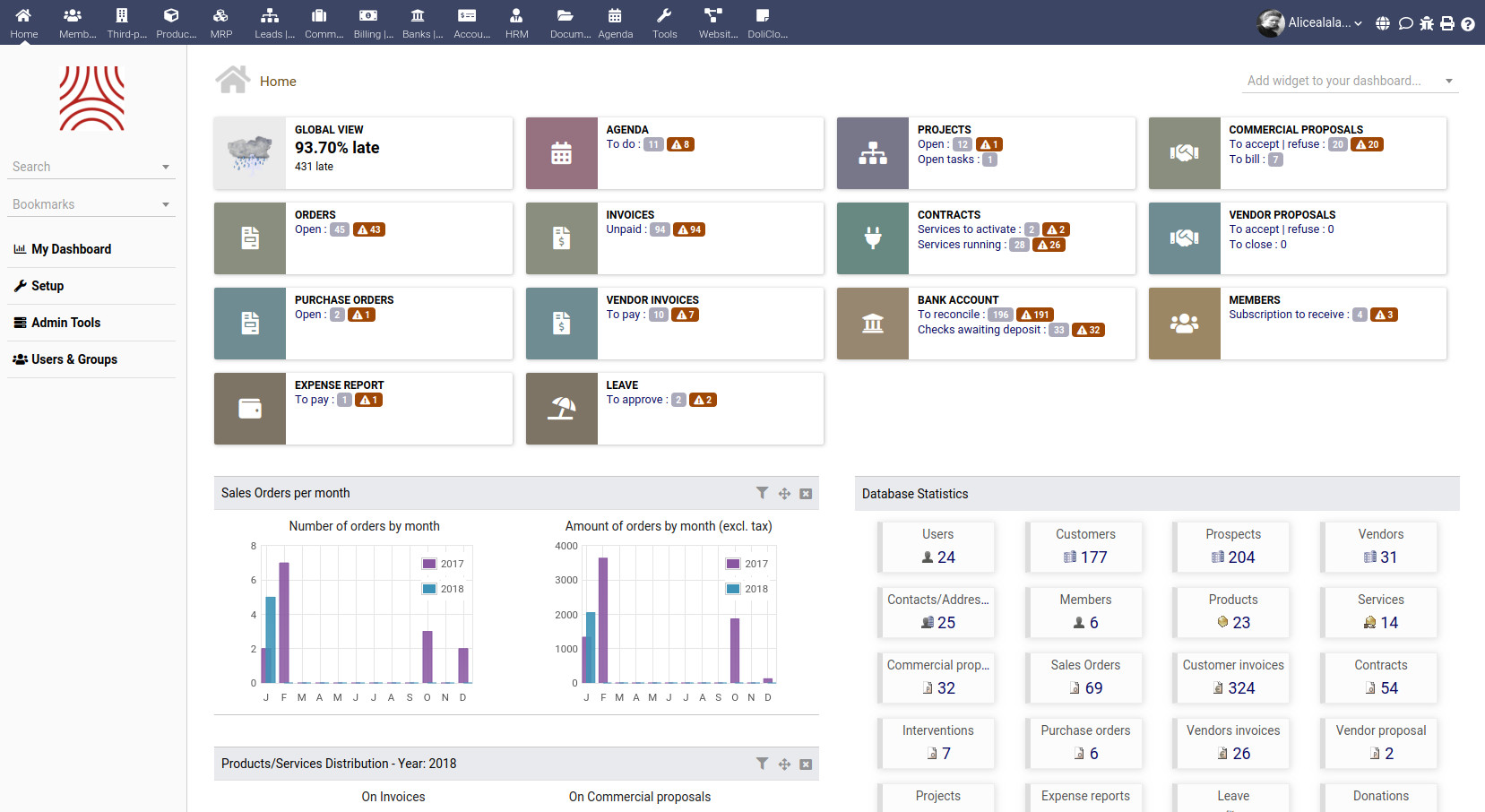
- Developer: Dolibarr team (Project leader: Laurent Destailleur)
- Stable release: 24.0.1 / 7 September 2026; 33 days ago
- Written in: PHP
- Operating system: Cross-platform
- Type: ERP, CRM, Accounting, SaaS
- License: GNU General Public License 3.0
- Website: dolibarr.org
- Repository: sourceforge.net/projects/dolibarr/files/

Dolibarr ERP CRM is an open source, free software package for companies of any size, foundations or freelancers. It includes different features for enterprise resource planning (ERP) and customer relationship management (CRM), and also other features for different activities.

== Features ==
There are several feature modules that can be enabled or disabled, as needed. This software is free under GNU General Public License 3.0. It is a web-based application, and can therefore be used wherever an internet service is available. Dolibarr aims to offer free open source ERP and CRM features for people with no technical knowledge, by providing a simple solution.

Dolibarr includes all the important features of an ERP CRM suite. It is modular and is thus characterized by its ease of installation and use, despite the large number of features.

Main Dolibarr features include:

=== Main modules ===
- Sales Management
- Purchase Management
- Commercial proposals management
- Customer Relationship Management
- Products and services catalog
- Stock Management
- Event Management
- Bank account management
- Address book
- Calendar
- Foundation-members management
- Payments management
- Donations management
- Contracts management
- Standing orders management
- Shipping management
- Point of sale
- Electronic document management
- Project Management
- Manufacturing resource planning
- Human resource management
- Surveys
- PDF and OpenDocument generation
- Reporting
- Wizard to help to export/import data
- LDAP connectivity

=== Miscellaneous ===
- Multi-user, with several permissions levels for each feature.
- Multi-language
- Multi-currency
- User-friendly
- Assorted skins
- Code is highly customizable (modular).
- Works with MySQL 5.1 or higher, PostgreSQL 9.1.0 or higher and PHP 7.1 though 8.4.

=== Missing features ===
These features are not available in the most recent version of Dolibarr:

- Manages (by default) only one company/foundation (mono-company). This means if you want to manage two different companies, you either need to install the software twice, or install an external addon.
- No Webmail (not to be confused with a mailing-list).

== Architecture ==
Dolibarr is written in PHP. It uses MySQL, MariaDB or PostgreSQL databases. It works with a wide choice of hosting services or servers. Dolibarr works with all PHP configurations and does not require any additional PHP modules.

Dolibarr can also be installed from an auto-installer file that is available for Windows, Mac and Linux. This is aimed at enabling users with no technical knowledge to install Dolibarr and its prerequisites (such as Apache, MySQL and PHP). This version is called DoliWamp for Windows users, DoliDeb for Debian or Ubuntu users, DoliRpm for Fedora, Redhat, Mandriva or OpenSuse users.

== History ==
Dolibarr was started by Rodolphe Quiédeville in April 2002. At this time, Jean-Louis Bergamo began writing the foundation management module. Version 1.0 was released in September 2003.

In July 2008, Laurent Destailleur - the main contributor and author of AWStats - took over from Rodolphe Quiédeville as the main developer. A foundation and several user groups have been created in several countries. The first was set up in France, the country where Dolibarr is most well-known. Dolibarr's popularity in France increased after it was freely distributed by a number of government agencies to people starting up new businesses. The software is also translated into more than 50 languages.

== Awards ==
2003
1st in the category "Management Company" at the Les Trophées du Libre contest.
2014, 2015, 2016
Several times project of the week (March 2014, September 2015, September 2016...)
2020
Trophy Naos d'Or
Project of the month December 2020

== ERP Research Regarding Dolibarr ==
Dolibarr ERP also pique by some researcher for ERP studies like future of ERP, Multi Branch ERP Solution, integration with several e-commerce, ERP Evolution, reporting analysis

== See also ==
- Comparison of accounting software
- Other ERP/CRM software: Compiere, Odoo, Openbravo, Tryton
- List of free and open source software packages
