= ERPNext =

Enterprise resource planning software

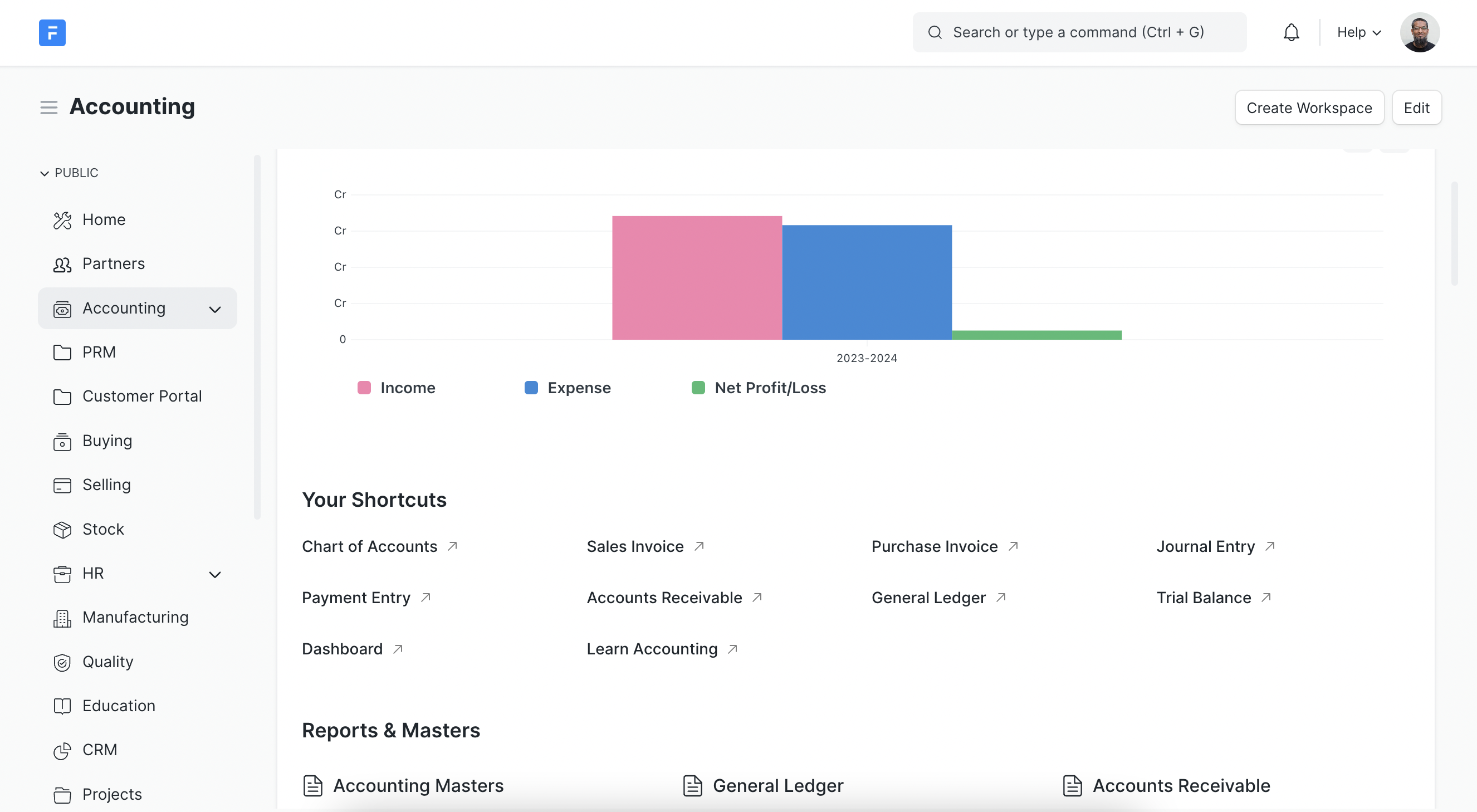
- Home page
- Original author: Rushabh Mehta
- Developers: Frappe Technologies Pvt. Ltd. and Community
- Release: 2008; 18 years ago
- Stable release: v16.32.3 / 18 August 2026; 2 months ago
- Written in: Python, JavaScript, and Vue.js
- Type: ERP, CRM, Accounting, Human Resource Management, Retail, Healthcare, Education
- License: GPL-3.0-only
- Website: frappe.io/erpnext
- Repository: github.com/frappe/erpnext

ERPNext is a free and open-source integrated enterprise resource planning (ERP) software developed by an Indian software company Frappe Technologies Pvt. Ltd. It is built on the MariaDB database system using Frappe, a Python based server-side framework.

ERPNext is a generic ERP software used by manufacturers, distributors and services companies. It includes modules like accounting, CRM, sales, purchasing, website, e-commerce, point of sale, manufacturing, warehouse, project management, inventory, and services. Also, it has domain specific modules like schools, healthcare, agriculture, and non-profit.

ERPNext is an alternative to NetSuite and QAD, and similar in function to Odoo (formerly OpenERP), Tryton and Openbravo. ERPNext was included in the ERP FrontRunners List by Gartner as a Pacesetters.

== Core modules ==
ERPNext contains these modules:

- Accounting
- Asset management
- Project management
- Purchasing
- Sales management
- Warehouse management system
- Manufacturing – Manufacturing
- Organization
- Buying
- Quality
- Subcontracting

== Official Separate Applications ==
- CRM (Frappe CRM)
- Human Resources and Payroll (Frappe HR / HRMS)
- Helpdesk (Frappe Helpdesk)
- Insights (Frappe Insights)
- Lending (Frappe Lending)
- Learning (Frappe Learning)
- Shipping (ERPNext Shipping)
- Website (Frappe Builder)
- Messaging (Raven)
- Ecommerce Integrations (Ecommerce Integrations for ERPNext)
- Payments (Payments)
- Telephony (Telephony)
- India Payroll (India Payroll)
- Education (Frappe Education)
- Wiki (Frappe Wiki)
- Gameplan

== Software license ==
ERPNext is released under the GPL-3.0-only license. Consequently, ERPNext does not require license fees as opposed to proprietary ERP vendors. In addition, as long as the terms of the licenses are adhered to, modification of the program is possible.

== Architecture ==
ERPNext has a model–view–controller architecture with metadata modeling tools that add flexibility for users to adapt the software to unique purposes without the need for programming. Some attributes of the architecture are:

- All objects in the ERP are DocTypes (not to be confused with HTML DocTypes) and the Views are generated directly in the browser.
- Client interacts with the server via JSON data objects on a JSON-RPC supporting server.
- There is ability to plug-in (event driven) code on the client and server side.

The underlying web app framework is called "Frappe Framework" and is maintained as a separate open source project. Frappe started as a web-based metadata framework inspired from Protégé though it has evolved differently.

This architecture allows Rapid Application Development (RAD).

== Source code and documentation ==
ERPNext source code is hosted on GitHub, using the Git revision control system, and the contributions are also handled using GitHub.

A complete user manual is available at the project website.

== Software as a service ==
ERPNext is available both on user hosting and as a software as a service (SaaS) from their website. The product also received a funding of INR 10 crore ($1.3 million) from Zerodha and Rainmatter in June 2022.

== Investment ==
In November 2020, Rainmatter incubator invested ₹10 crore ($1.3M) in Frappe Technologies PL, to support development of ERPNext, other open source products, and scaling plans.

== Release history ==
Old version, no official support, community support only
Supported version
Future version

Version	Release date/month	Significant changes
1.0	June 2010	First release. ERPNext source code was (then) published on Google Code.
2.0	July 2012	
3.0	April 2013	
4.0	February 2014	Introduced app architecture in Frappe Framework.
5.0	19 May 2015	Improved UI, Item Variants, Print Format Builder, Sharing, Starring, Document Timelines, Multi-Currency accounting, Party model
6.0	2 September 2015	ERPNext Schools, Calendar View for transactions, Doctype exports
7.0	22 July 2016	Online/Offline POS, Asset Depreciation, Payment Entry, Timesheets, Dashboards, Editable grid, Quick Entry view, Smarter Lists
8.0	30 March 2017	Global Search, Kanban View, Document Versioning, Delete and Restore, Email Inbox, Employee Loan, Enhanced POS, Multiple UOMs in Selling, Accrual system in Payroll, Custom Permissions, Customer Feedback, School Assessment Module
9.0	26 September 2017	Healthcare Domain, Subscription, School Fees Management, New Setup Wizard
10.0	29 December 2017	Agriculture Domain, Non-profit Domain, Data Import upgrades, Employee Advance, Item Variant Enhancements
11.0	10 December 2018	Multi-company consolidated financial statement, Payroll per Tax Declaration, Employee On-boarding and Off-boarding, Finance Book, CWIP Accounting, Staffing Plan, Inter-company Journal Entry, Exchange Rate Revaluation, Leave Policy, Conditional Workflows, Payroll and Accounting Period, Serialised Assets, Tax Withholding, Shift Plan, Budgeting in Material Request
12.0	22 July 2019	Graphical Dashboard, Custom Report with Chart Builder, Postgres Support, Multi-select Field, Enhanced Website and Portal, Improved Pricing Rule, Accounting Dimensions, Invoice Discounting, BOM Explorer, Auto Attendance, Leave Ledger, Promotional Scheme, SLA, Email Campaign, Learning Management System, Quality Management System, Production Planning Enhancements, Project Template, New Desktop, Keyboard Navigation, Link Preview, Assignment Rule, Exotel Call Integration, Milestones, Auto Repeat, Document Follow, Energy Points, Google Contacts, PDF Encryption, Raw Printing, Web Form Refactor, Custom columns in report
13.0	2020	Custom Desk, SLA on custom documents, Bootstrapped Dashboards for each module, In-patient module in Healthcare, Module Onboarding, Event streaming, Perpetual accounting for Services, Cancelling downstream transactions on single click, POS Invoicing, Production Forecast, Social Media post from ERPNext, India PF and PT calculation, Conditional Mandatory field, BOM and JV template, India GST reports
14.0	1 August 2022	Customizable Workspaces, New Print Format Builder, new Subcontracting flow, Organisational Chart, Tab View in forms, Warehouse Management & Inventory Dimensions, Scrap management, Payment Ledger, KSA and Tanzania accounting, Asset Grouping and Splitting, Asset Capitalisation, Bulk Transaction Processing, better handling of multi-currency transactions
15.0	10 September 2023	Multi-level BOM creator, Auto Currency Exchange Re-valuation, POS stock update in run-time, Financial Ratios report, Accounting Dimension Balancing, Asset Activity Tracking, Print Format Designer, Advance Payment in a separate Liability Account, PWA Mobile app for HR module, Stock reservation against Sales Order, Frappe Builder
16.0	10 December 2025	Iconic dashboard, Production tracking at the job card level, subcontracting inward flow, better handling of valuation for landed cost, accounting for purchase items in P&L, much better performance, and much more. Refer to the detailed update log here.

== FOSS United ==
FOSS United (formerly ERPNext Open Source Software Foundation) is a non-for-profit organization. The goal of the foundation is to provide a platform for the FOSS community of India to come together and build open source applications. Foundation also organises various events like conference and code sprints.

== See also ==
- List of ERP software packages
- iDempiere
- List of free and open source software packages
