= Advanced Manufacturing Software =

Software product

- Developer(s): I.B.I.S. Inc.
- Operating system: Microsoft Windows
- Type: ERP / Manufacturing
- License: Proprietary
- Website: advancedmanufacturingsoftware.com

Advanced Manufacturing Software (AMS) is an enterprise resource planning (ERP) software product based on the Microsoft Dynamics AX platform.

The product is part of the Certified for Microsoft Dynamics family of products and is intended to assist with finance, discrete manufacturing, distribution, customer relationship management (CRM), supply chains, analytics and electronic commerce for Industrial Equipment Manufacturers, Automotive & Aerospace Manufacturers and High Tech & Electronics Manufacturers with facilities in the United States and globally. The software product is developed by I.B.I.S. Inc.

== Features ==
Advanced Manufacturing Software contains the following discrete manufacturing specific modules:

- Microsoft Dynamics AX Core ERP Functionality
- Lean Manufacturing
- Field Service Management & Asset Service Management
- Customer Relationship Management
- Enterprise Asset Management
- Shop Floor Integration
- Integrated Electronic Data Interchange (EDI)
- Plant Maintenance Scheduling
- Forecasting Tools
- Financial Management
- Human Resources Management (HR)
- Product Engineering
- Project Management for Manufacturing
- Sales Estimating / Quoting
- Visual Project Planning
- Warehouse Management System (WMS)
- Warehouse inventory transfers
- Warehouse control system

== Competition ==
- Epicor
- Infor
- Abas Business Software
- Oracle E-Business Suite
