= Knova =

Knova or k-nova may refer to:

- Kilonova, a type of supernova
- KNOVA customer relationship management service, a division of Consona Corporation
- KNOVA Learning, Reynolds School District (Oregon), Multnomah County, Oregon, USA; a charter school

== See also ==
- SuperKnova, U.S. musician
- Nova (disambiguation)
