= Infor XA =

ERP software

- Other names: MAPICS
- Original author: IBM
- Developer: Infor
- Release: 1977
- Stable release: Release 10
- Written in: RPG, Control Language
- Operating system: IBM i
- Type: Enterprise resource planning
- Website: www.infor.com/products/xa

Infor XA is commercial enterprise resource planning (ERP) software used to control the operations of manufacturing companies. It was initially known as MAPICS (Manufacturing, Accounting and Production Information Control Systems). MAPICS was created by IBM. The product has been owned by Infor Global Solutions since 2005.

MAPICS originally ran only on IBM midrange systems like the IBM System 34, 36, 38, and the IBM AS/400, via succeeding versions of the platform - IBM i on IBM Power Systems. Early versions were written in IBM RPG, augmented with Control Language programs. IBM's version of SQL is also utilized on the OS integrated database system called Db2 for i. Development efforts have added object oriented components written in the Java programming language, which extends a portion of the XA product to servers running Java.

The Infor XA product still requires the IBM i operating system. The Java components provide an application runtime which allow user customizations, a rich user interface, an optional web-based interface as well as support for XML interfaces.

== Timeline ==
1977	IBM develops and markets MAPICS
1993	IBM sells MAPICS to Marcam
1997	Marcam splits into two companies and MAPICS Incorporated is created
2000	MAPICS Inc. acquires Pivotpoint (for its MS Windows based Point.Man ERP system)
2003	MAPICS Inc. acquires Frontstep (for its Progress and .NET based SyteLine ERP system)
2005	MAPICS Incorporated is acquired by Infor. MAPICS is renamed Infor ERP XA

== See also ==
- List of ERP software packages
- List of ERP vendors
