= Jeeves (disambiguation) =

Jeeves is a fictional character created by writer P. G. Wodehouse.

Jeeves may also refer to:

== People ==
- Frank Jeeves (1927–2010), Australian rules footballer
- Malcolm Jeeves (born 1926), British Psychologist
- Percy Jeeves (1888–1916), English cricketer

== Other uses ==
- Jeeves Information Systems, a software developer in Sweden and its product Jeeves ERP
- Ask Jeeves, a former web search engine with "Jeeves" branding, later called Ask.com
- Jeeves, a Disney character from the Donald Duck universe
