= While You Were Out =

While You Were Out may refer to:

- While You Were Out (TV series), American reality series
- While You Were Out (album), a 1986 album by Soul Asylum
- While You Were Out (cloud application), an enterprise messaging and content management application
