= Boniva =

Boniva may refer to:

- Boniva, a company acquired by software company SSA Global Technologies in August 2005
- Boniva, a brand name for medication ibandronic acid
