= Elements Software =

Elements Software, formerly known as Helveta, is a supply chain management software company and "provider of technology solutions for the timber industry" based in Abingdon, Oxfordshire, England. With revenues of £2.1 million in 2010, it has been recognized for its work in forestry conservation, specifically illegal logging prevention.

== History ==
Patrick Newton founded Helveta in Abingdon, Oxfordshire in 2004. The company developed supply-chain management software Control Intelligence (CI) World to allow customers to track assets. Supported industries include biofuel, food processing, and forestry. In 2010 Helveta's revenues reached £2.1 million.

In 2008, the Forest Development Authority hired Helveta and SGS, an inspection firm, to develop a technology barcode scanning system to track lumber in Liberia, where the United Nations banned the logging trade in 2003. Helveta also earned clients in the Democratic Republic of the Congo and Cameroon, where a similar project ran from 2008 to 2011. The Cameroon project met many of its goals but failed to secure a long-term commitment in part due to changing government authorities.

=== Leadership ===
Karim Peer is the chief executive officer (CEO) after replacing Newton in 2011.

== Awards and recognition ==
The Financial Times recognized Helveta as a "Boldness in Business" 2012 award winner for finding profit-making opportunities in sustainable development. In 2015, Helveta was selected as a top ten finalist in the EY Startup Challenge.
