= Greentree (disambiguation) =

Greentree is a 400-acre (1.6 km^{2}) estate in Manhasset, New York on Long Island.

Greentree may also refer to:

- Greentree, New Jersey, United States
- Greentree Business Software, a software company from New Zealand
- Greentree Stable, an American thoroughbred horse racing stable and breeding business

== People with the surname ==
- Kyle Greentree (born 1983), Canadian professional ice hockey player
- Leslie Greentree (21st century), Canadian poet
- Liam Greentree (born 2006), Canadian ice hockey player

== See also ==
- Green Tree, Pennsylvania, United States
- Greentree Corner
- The Green Tree, pub in Patrick Brompton, in England
