= Epiphany, Inc. =

- Type: Private
- Industry: Computer software
- Founded: 1996; 30 years ago in Mountain View, California
- Founder: Steve Blank; Ben Wegbreit
- Fate: Acquired by SSA Global Technologies (2005)
- Headquarters: San Mateo, California
- Products: CRM
- Revenue: $71.5 million USD (2004)

Epiphany, Inc. (previous NASDAQ symbol: EPNY), previously known as E.piphany and Epiphany Marketing Software, was an American software company headquartered in San Mateo, California. The company developed customer relationship management (CRM) software used to analyze customer data and manage marketing, sales, and customer service. Founded in 1996 by Steve Blank and Ben Wegbreit, Epiphany introduced its first commercial software suite in 1999 and completed an initial public offering on the Nasdaq that September.

== History ==
Epiphany was incorporated in 1996 as E.piphany Marketing Software. It was co-founded by Steve Blank, Ben Wegbreit, with Greg Walsh, and John McCaskey serving as its lead programmers. By 1998, Roger Siboni was CEO and the following year the company sought to raise investment via an initial public offering.

In January 1999, the company introduced the Epiphany E.4 System, a suite of 16 applications that combined information from sales, billing, and marketing databases into a browser-accessible database. Its early customers included Hewlett-Packard and Wells Fargo.

Epiphany completed its initial public offering on September 22, 1999. In November the same year, the company acquired RightPoint Inc., an internet customer management software supplier, at a $393.8 million value.

In 2000, the company acquired Octane Software, a company that developed customer care applications. On September 29, 2005, Epiphany was acquired by SSA Global Technologies. Epiphany CRM software is now produced by Infor, which acquired SSA Global in 2006.

== Leadership ==
Roger Siboni was president and CEO of the company from 1998 to 2003. Karen Richardson was named CEO in 2003 and held the position until 2005.
