= Plex Systems =

Software company

Plex Systems, Inc.
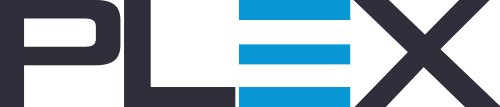
- Industry: Software
- Founded: 1995; 31 years ago
- Headquarters: Troy, Michigan, United States
- Area served: Americas, EMEA, Asia-Pacific
- Products: Enterprise software, including: ERP, MES, QMS, SCMS, CRM
- Website: plex.rockwellautomation.com

Plex Systems, Inc. is an American software company based in Troy, Michigan. The company develops and markets the Plex Manufacturing Cloud, a software as a service (SaaS) or cloud computing ERP for manufacturing.

Plex System was acquired by Rockwell Automation in 2021 for $2.2 billion dollars.

== History ==
Plex Systems began as an internal IT project at an automotive parts manufacturer, MSP Industries Corporation, in 1989. The company was formed as Plexus Systems LLC in 1995 by Robert Beatty, providing client/server manufacturing software. The company began offering its software via the software as a service (SaaS) or cloud computing model when Plexus Online was launched in 2001.

In 2006 Apax Partners acquired a majority interest in the company.

In 2009, the company changed its name to Plex Systems and renamed its flagship product Plex Online. In June 2012, the company announced the acquisition from a group of share holders, including Apax Partners by Francisco Partners. In June 2012, Accel Partners invested $30 million in Plex: In June 2014, Plex secured $50 million in additional funding led by T. Rowe Price, which joined existing investors Francisco Partners and Accel Partners. The investment will be used to support expanded product development, as well as investments in marketing and sales. In June 2021, Plex was acquired by Rockwell Automation $2.22 billion in cash.

Aberdeen Group suggested in its "Aberdeen AXIS: ERP in Manufacturing 2009” report that Plex Systems was among the top four performing ERP vendors. Plex was the only ERP software solution provider placed entirely within the “Champion” performance category, just ahead of SAP AG. (There is evidence of Plex acting as a sponsor for Aberdeen Group so this report from Aberdeen may be biased) However, other vendors evaluated in the same report are also sponsors of Aberdeen Group.

Historically, the company has not released detailed financial information, citing its status as a privately held corporation. However, in May 2012, the company reported a revenue increase of 30.6% in the first quarter ending March 31, compared to a year earlier. Recurring revenue increased by 30.5 percent, representing the 19th consecutive quarter of growth."

Plex is known as the first provider of a complete SaaS ERP solution for manufacturing companies. Several IT software bloggers have written about Plex’s ability to provide a wide scope of critical features for manufacturers in a SaaS model, where larger ERP vendors had not succeeded at the time.

== Product ==
The Plex Manufacturing Cloud is a software as a service (SaaS) or cloud application ERP that manages the manufacturing process and supports the functions of production, inventory, shipping, supply-chain management, quality, accounting, sales, and human resource departments, in addition to the traditional ERP roles of finance/accounting, procurement, human capital management, etc.

Plex is targeted towards manufacturing industries with rigorous traceability, quality and food safety requirements, including automotive, aerospace, food & beverage, and life sciences or medical manufacturing. The system must be accessed using a web browser, making its functions available from anywhere with an Internet connection. The software is designed to provide managers and engineers with real-time visibility to production data.

While Plex Systems calls the SaaS solution "ERP", the software also includes the following integrated functions:

- Enterprise resource planning (ERP):
- Manufacturing execution system (MES) or manufacturing operations management (MOM)
- Quality management systems (QMS). It helps maintain compliance with quality standards including ISO 9000 and ISO 14000, QS-9000, TS-16949, AS-9100, etc.
- Elastic MES, introduced in 2025 as a modular and scalable manufacturing execution system.
- Customer relationship management (CRM)
- Supply chain management software (SCMS):

== See also ==
- List of ERP software packages
- List of ERP vendors
