= Ciright Systems =

Information technology services company

Ciright, Inc.
- Type: Private
- Industry: Information Technology Services, Saas/PaaS, Cloud Computing
- Founded: 1993
- Headquarters: West Conshohocken, Pennsylvania
- Key people: Joseph Callahan (Chief Executive Officer), Ankit Mekwan (Chief Technology Officer)
- Products: Ciright Platform 13.2
- Website: www.ciright.com

Ciright Inc. is an information technology services company based in West Conshohocken, Pennsylvania United States. Its flagship product is a Platform As A Service (PaaS) based Interoperable Cloud Platform ("The Ciright Platform") that provides office and business automation to small and medium-sized businesses. The Ciright Platform also provides immediate mobile extendability to an enterprise's legacy system.

Ciright Systems is a wholly owned subsidiary of Ciright, Inc. The company also has operations in Ahmedabad, India (Ciright Enterprise Pvt. Ltd., commonly referred to as "Ciright India").

== History ==
Ciright Systems was founded in 1993 by Joseph Callahan (then known as Viewpoint Software) as a company that initially developed wireless applications on tablet devices and incorporated advances in pen computing and wireless technologies. Ciright has built solutions for hand held computers that are platform independent.

Ciright was founded in 1993, coding sales force and field worker applications for multiple specific vertical markets on the PenRight! Platform. A user could interface with a digital screen with a pen, physically mimicking the relationship of pen and paper.

In 1994, Ciright developed business process applications for the EO Personal Communicator in the GO Operating system. Partnered with AT&T Ciright positioned enterprise efficiency applications through the reduction of paper and the enhancement of communication as the EO tablet was also a phone capable of network communication of data as well as faxing technology integrated to OCR systems.

In 1995, the company was incorporated. That year, Ciright developed an application, While You Were Out, a pen based executive messaging software, that allowed an executive to receive his messages on a digital tablet device.

In 2000, Ciright developed a pen based solution provided for the Slate Vision hardware platform. Later, Ciright expanded to include professional services such as engineering firms, architects, and construction management. Finally in 2006 the system was migrated from a client–server environment into a total web based system.

In 2008, Ciright developed an application for the iPhone, available for the iPhone 3GS and iPhone 4 models. This app provides the user mobile access to their Ciright Platform data. In 2009, Ciright was awarded a multimillion-dollar contract from the Philadelphia Housing Authority to deploy a real time SCADA energy information monitoring and management system.

Ciright began development for an application on the iPad in 2010.

Ciright becomes part of the Portals.org team in 2024.

== The Ciright Platform 13.2 ==
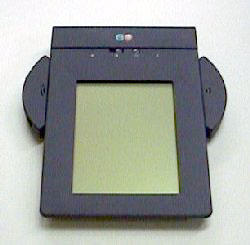
The EO Personal Communicator was released in April 1993

The Ciright Platform (Version 13.2) automates the enterprise through optimizing data entry via wireless networks, so that focus is placed on appropriate time sensitive tasks that are correlated to industry-specific sales pipeline categories. This process enables enterprise management and leadership to track yesterday's business, monitors today's efficiency, and plan for tomorrow's growth.

Ciright is designed to manage and grow a business' sales processes and operations. It leverages the information that is available to an organization and current technology to enhance management's ability to powerfully and intelligently identify the path to optimal profit and growth, and to direct the enterprise's sales force.

=== Scalability ===
- The Ciright kernel supports scalability, and Ciright solutions are industry agnostic.
- The Ciright Platform eliminates the need for business management software and software licensing; including, but not limited to, accounting software, desktop document, presentation, and spreadsheet programs, and business management packages.

=== Security ===
Ciright platform incorporates 512 bit encryption at the device level. This means that the computer which pushed the document to the cloud initially is the only computer that has the ability to access it later. All data on the Ciright platform is thereby protected, and it is also backed up in perpetuity.

=== U.S. Patent US8363618 B2 Content distribution platform ===
ABSTRACT A system is adapted to manage the distribution of content to one or more cooperating media/substrates. The system receives data representative of environment conditions for one or more cooperating media/substrates adapted to display digital content. The media/substrates may be located in public spaces. The system compares the received data representative of environment conditions with selection criteria to identify content for distribution to the media/substrates. The selected content is distributed to the one or more cooperating media/substrates.

=== Interactive digital signage pilot program ===
CDM was issued U.S. Patent No. 8,363,618 B2 on 29 January 2013 enabling the Pilot Program to give companies the unique opportunity to engage their target audiences in never-before possible ways. The VertNext Platform allows digital signage systems to measure, analyze, and re-render content in real time based on changing localized variables, including weather, traffic, sports scores, etc., as well as facial expressions, gestures, and anonymous demographics.
