= Deacom =

Enterprise resource planning company

Deacom, LLC (an ECI Software Solutions Company)
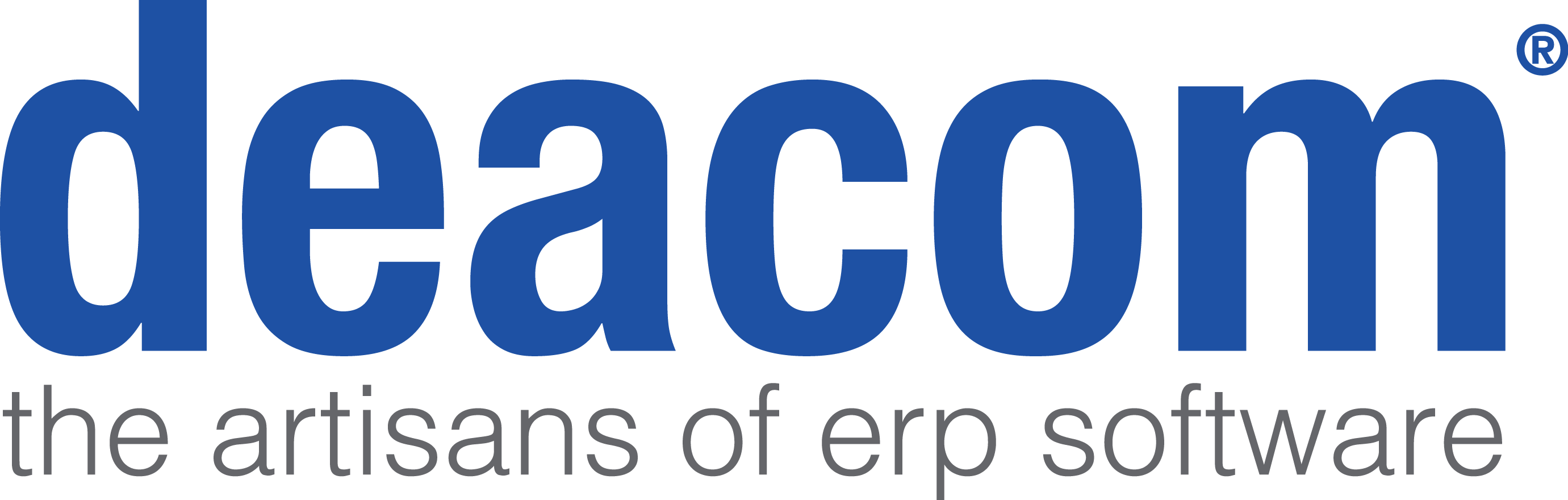
- Type: Private
- Industry: Enterprise Resource Planning
- Founded: 1995; 31 years ago
- Headquarters: Wayne, Pennsylvania; Centennial, CO; Frankfurt, Germany
- Key people: Jay Deakins (Founder); Scott Deakins (COO)
- Products: DEACOM ERP
- Website: deacom.com

Deacom, LLC (also known as Deacom) produces enterprise resource planning (ERP) software for manufacturing and distribution companies.

== History ==
Deacom was founded by Jay Deakins in 1995. The company focuses on developing and licensing an ERP software package to manufacturing and distribution clients. Deacom has three offices in Chesterbrook, PA, Denver, CO, and Frankfurt, Germany. The Frankfurt office opened in February 2020 to provide support to customers with European operations. In August 2021, the company was acquired by ECI Software Solutions and now serves as their global platform for the batch and process industry.

== Software ==
Deacom produces a system, referred to as DEACOM ERP, that is designed for manufacturing and distribution companies which include: food and beverage, pharmaceuticals, cosmetics, sealants, and paints. The software was originally built on Microsoft Visual FoxPro but was converted to the .NET platform in 2017. Since Version 15, the system's architecture is built on a Microsoft technology stack. The ERP system can be deployed either on-premises or hosted in the cloud.
