= HashMicro =

Enterprise software company

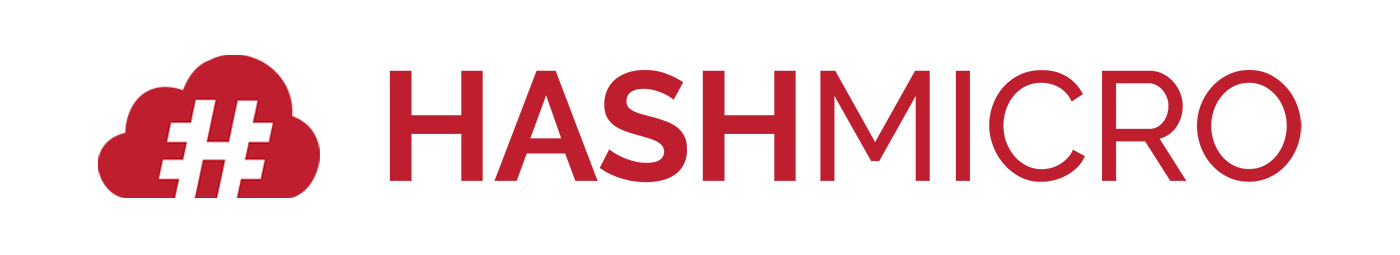
- Developer: HashMicro
- Written in: Python
- Operating system: Windows, macOS, Linux, Unix
- Platform: Cross-platform (On-premises)
- Type: Enterprise resource planning
- License: Commercial, Proprietary
- Website: www.hashmicro.com/erp-system

HashMicro is a multinational enterprise software company widely used in Asia Pacific, specializing in cloud-based Enterprise Resource Planning (ERP). Its software is primarily designed for medium and large enterprises and multinational corporations. The company offers a suite of modular ERP applications covering finance, inventory, manufacturing, procurement, CRM, human resources, and more. While the company provides packages for growing enterprises, its core system architecture is oriented toward supporting the complex operational requirements of larger organizations.

Founded in 2015 by Ricky Halim, HashMicro is known for its emphasis on a comprehensive ERP ecosystem with AI-driven automation and seamless integrations with regional regulatory compliance. In 2025, the company introduced Hashy, an AI assistant that allows users to manage ERP operations through messaging platforms.

HashMicro is recognized as the largest ERP brand operating in Asia Pacific, serving a wide range of industries and expanding its presence through partnerships.

== History ==
HashMicro was established in 2015 in Singapore by Ricky Halim, a graduate of the University of Wollongong, Australia. Along with Lusiana Lu, Chief of Business Development of HashMicro, they observed the fragmented digital infrastructure among SMEs and multi-national enterprises in Asia Pacific, Halim aimed to develop a cost-effective, scalable ERP platform tailored to regional operational styles and regulatory requirements.

Initially, HashMicro focused on providing digital solutions to medium-sized and large enterprises across various industries. Over time, the company expanded to support end-to-end operations for small and medium-sized businesses.

== Operations ==
HashMicro operates across Asia Pacific with offices in Singapore, Indonesia, Malaysia, Philippines, and Australia. Its clientele spans industries such as manufacturing, retail, distribution, F&B, construction, professional services, engineering, mining, agriculture, and education.

As of 2024, the company employs more than 500 staff members and serves over 2,000 businesses in the region.

HashMicro's solutions are deployed on a cloud infrastructure with options for on-premise implementation. The company supports integrations with local tax authorities, banking, marketplace, and logistics providers, aiming to reduce manual workflows.

== Partnerships and government collaboration ==
HashMicro is a recognized vendor under Singapore’s Infocomm Media Development Authority (IMDA) through the Productivity Solutions Grant (PSG) program, which subsidizes ERP adoption among SMEs.

In Indonesia, the company has participated in digitalization initiatives led by the Ministry of State-Owned Enterprises and collaborates with the Ministry of Education to promote ERP literacy among students through educational programs.

The company’s ERP systems are also designed to comply with regional financial and tax regulations, including:

- Directorate General of Taxes (DJP) – Indonesia
- Inland Revenue Authority of Singapore (IRAS) – Singapore
- Lembaga Hasil Dalam Negeri (LHDN) – Malaysia
- Bureau of Internal Revenue (BIR) – Philippines

These regulatory alignments ensure that modules such as accounting, e-invoicing, and tax reporting are optimized for local compliance, enabling businesses to meet statutory requirements efficiently.

== Company culture and brand identity ==
HashMicro operates under the brand philosophy of "Bring Joy to Work," a tagline that encapsulates the company's commitment to making business processes not only more efficient but also more enjoyable for its users. This guiding principle influences both product development and client engagement strategies. By focusing on intuitive user experiences, customer satisfaction, and AI-powered assistance like Hashy, the company aims to eliminate friction in everyday workflows and reduce operational stress.

== Awards and recognition ==
- CNBC Awards – Best Business Software (2023)
- CNBC Awards – Best Business Software (2024)
- CNBC Awards – Best Business Software (2025)
- CNN Awards – Excellent Software Implementation (2025)
- Alibaba Cloud Honor – The Igniters of Digital Synergy (2025)
- Leading Women Awards CNN - Best AI Innovator of the Year (2026), received by Chief of Business Development Director, Lusiana Lu, for her contribution in the development of HMX, HashMicro's AI-based business software.
