= SSA Global Technologies =

SSA Global
- Type: Private
- Industry: Computer software
- Founded: Chicago, Illinois (1981)
- Defunct: July 2006
- Fate: acquired by Infor
- Headquarters: Chicago, Illinois
- Key people: Michael Greenough (president, chairman and CEO), Cory A. Eaves (CTO); Graeme Cooksley (EVP, Sales, Marketing, & Operations); Carlos E. Galarce (GVP and CIO), Stephen P. Earhart (EVP and CFO); Stephanie Kelley (GVP HR)
- Products: ERP
- Revenue: $637,800,000 USD (2004)
- Number of employees: 3,702
- Website: www.ssaglobal.com

SSA Global Technologies (previous NASDAQ symbol: SSAG) was a company developing Enterprise resource planning (ERP) software. On May 15, 2006, SSA Global announced that it would be acquired by Infor Global Solutions. The acquisition was completed on July 28, 2006.

== Acquisitions ==
- Max International in April, 2001
- interBiz Product Group, previously a division of Computer Associates International Inc. in April, 2002
- Infinium Software in December, 2002
- Ironside Technologies, in June, 2003
- Elevon Inc, in July, 2003
- Baan, in July, 2003
- EXE Technologies, in December, 2003
- Arzoon, Inc., in June, 2004
- Marcam, in July, 2004
- Boniva, in August, 2005
- Epiphany, in September, 2005
- Provia Software, in March, 2006

== Products ==
- Baan
- BPCS
- ERP LN
- ERP LX
- Corporate performance management
- Customer Relationship Management
- Financial Management
- Human Capital Management
- Product Lifecycle Management
- Supply Chain Management
- Supplier Relationship Management
- Warehouse Management System
