= Business Planning and Control System =

Business planning software product

Business Planning and Control System (BPCS) is an Enterprise Resource Planning (ERP) software product.

BPCS, the acronym for the software, is pronounced as "Bee picks" or "Bee pecks" in Spanish-speaking countries.

== Overview ==
BPCS was developed by Chicago-based System Software Associates (SSA), which later became SSA Global Technologies (which was then acquired by Infor Global Solutions and rebranded as Infor LX), and is used to control the operations of manufacturing companies. BPCS includes MRP logic to manufacturing operations, provided there are high standards of data validity such as engineering specifications and inventory accuracy. It runs on several systems, with IBM I, being most popular. It is written in AS/SET CASE tool, RPG, SQL and other languages supported on IBM I.

Many of the BPCS modules are stand-alone, in that companies can choose to implement only the financial applications for example, and none of the manufacturing.

SSA began developing BPCS in the early 1980s; by the mid 1990s the BPCS programs were used internationally. Inc. magazine ranked SSA as the 23rd fastest growing small public company in 1988 and Business Week named it as the 25th best small company.

== BPCS Applications ==
BPCS Applications are very dependent on BPCS software version release, because SSA enters into partnerships with different specialty suppliers of applications such as Data Mining, Bar Coding, etc. and suppliers that integrated with a particular version.

The BPCS Application suite includes:

=== Financial ===
- Costing CST
- Accounts Payable ACP
- Accounts Receivable ACR
- Billing BIL
- General Ledger GLD
- Cash Management CSH
- Multiple Currencies MLT
- Currency Translation CTR
- Financial Assistant FIN
- Fixed Assets FXA
- Payroll PAY
- Business Modeling
- Data Mining

=== Planning ===
Most planning functions can be used in either Distribution or Manufacturing.

- Forecasting FOR
- Master Scheduling MPS
- Material Requirements Planning MRP
- Capacity Planning CAP
- Distribution Resource Planning (inter facility) DRP
- Planner's Assistant PLN
- Simulations
- Just In Time JIT

=== Distribution ===
Most planning functions are used in both Distribution and Manufacturing.

- Inventory INV
- Purchasing PUR
- Customer Order Processing ORD
- Billing BIL
- Sales Analysis SAL
- Promotions and Deals PRO
- Performance Measurement PRF
  - such as supplier quality and on-time, company performance in supplying customers, internal quality control
- Multiple Environments, Companies, Divisions, Facilities, Warehouses, Locations.

=== Manufacturing ===
Most planning functions are used in both Distribution and Manufacturing.

- Manufacturing Data Management BOM
  - Also Routings as SFC sub-set
- Inventory INV
- Shop Floor Control SFC
- Master Scheduling MPS
- Material Requirements Planning MRP
- Capacity planning CAP
- Laboratory Management LMS
- Just In Time JIT
- Quality Control QMS
- Repetitive Manufacturing
- CIMPath (barcoding and data collection) CIM
- Advanced Process (chemical) Industries API
- Performance Measurement (factory production) PRF

=== Systems Applications ===
- ASAP Information Retrieval
- Misc Reports & Retrievals
- System Parameters or Business Rules
  - Transaction Effects
- Documentation
- Data Base X-Reference
- Interest Area Menus
- Sliding Y2K Window
- Data Base upgrade

== See also ==
- Business System Planning
