= Erply =

Company based in Estonia

- Website type: point of sale, inventory management
- Available in: English
- Founded: Estonia
- Owner: Kristjan Hiiemaa via Erply Limited
- Industry: software
- Website: http://www.erply.com
- Commercial: Yes
- Launched: 2009
- Current status: Active

Erply is an enterprise software company which provides cloud-based point of sale and inventory management technology. It was founded in Estonia by Kristjan Hiiemaa in 2009.

== History ==
In 2009, the company won Seedcamp, a European early stage investment program.

In March 2010, they received $2 million in funding from Saul Klein (Index Ventures), Satish Dharmaraj (Redpoint Ventures), Dave McClure and Kenny van Zant.

== Description ==
The service was initially a retail payment solution for small to medium-sized businesses. They have since expanded to larger box retailers, and provide systems for point of sales, inventory control, billing, and other retail-related technologies. The service retails for $74 per month on average.

In August 2011, the company released a mobile credit card reader for handheld devices like Apple iPads.

== Reception ==
Erply has been profiled in media publications such as The Wall Street Journal, the Financial Times and the BBC. Erply as one of the top ten European startups to watch in 2011.
