= IDempiere =

Community Powered Enterprise. Full Open Source Business Suite

iDempiere
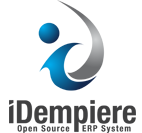

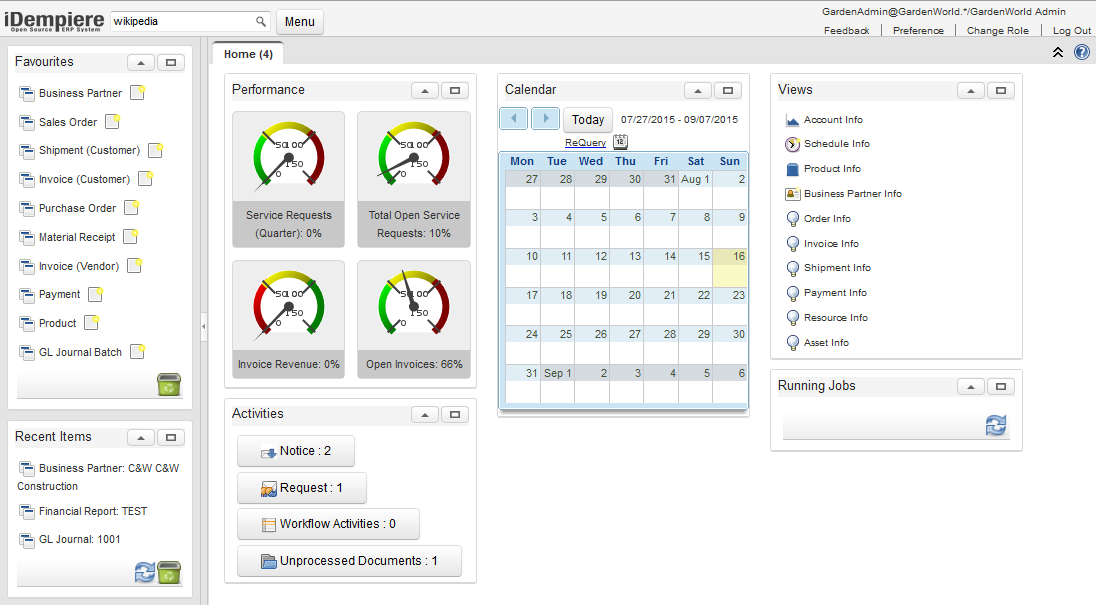
- Developer: virtual community
- Release: October 31, 2012; 13 years ago
- Stable release: v13 / Daily release
- Preview release: v14 / Dev Build
- Written in: Java, SQL
- Operating system: Windows, Linux, Mac, Solaris
- Platform: OSGi, Jetty, ZK (framework)
- Available in: 16 languages
- List of languages English, German, Indonesian, Spanish, Italian, Japanese, Romanian, Russian, Polish, Thai, Arabic, Bosnian, Portuguese, Catalán, Simplified Chinese, and many others
- Type: ERP, CRM, SCM
- License: GPLv2
- Website: www.idempiere.org
- Repository: https://github.com/idempiere/idempiere

iDempiere. Community Powered Enterprise, also known as OSGi + ADempiere, is an open source enterprise resource planning (ERP) software that is fully navigable on PCs, tablets and smartphones, it also has customer relationship management (CRM) and supply chain management (SCM) functions.

It is in contrast to proprietary or most other open source ERP solutions driven only by a community of supporters.

== Overview ==
The architecture of the iDempiere system allows it to easily expand its functions while maintaining a simple and flexible state of the ERP business system, iDempiere can be used freely and it supports:

- Multiple tenants
- Multiple organizations (branches, plants, etc.)
- Multiple languages (29 localizations; mixed access in a single installation is possible)
- Multiple currencies
- Multiple account schemas
- Multiple-user

== History ==
1999, Jorg Janke creates Compiere a predecessor of iDempiere. Jorg had previously worked at Oracle in Germany and the USA.

2006, starts the development of ADempiere as a fork of the open source version of Compiere.

2008–2010, in the Adempiere community some users work on a modular ERP design proposal, with some OSGI implementations like Apache Felix and Equinox.

2010, Adempiere 3.6.0 LTS and Branch GlobalQSS Adempiere361 are launched.

Version number	Release date	Notes
1.0.a Halloween Edition	October 31, 2012	First official version; Alpha version
1.0b Devina	April 24, 2013	Beta version
1.0c Devina LTS	June 27, 2013	
2.0	October 31, 2013	
2.1	October 31, 2014	
3.1 Maitreyi	October 31, 2015	
4.1	October 31, 2016	
5.1	October 31, 2017	
6.1	November 4, 2018	
6.2	January 4, 2019	
7.1	November 22, 2019	
8.1	November 3, 2020	Release candidate
8.2	December 20, 2020	8.2 Phong
9	December 24, 2021	9 Horizon
10	December 24, 2022	10 Peace
11	December 24, 2023	11 Synergy
12	December 24, 2024	12 Kudos
13	March 9, 2026: Daily maintained version 13 Orion; Stable version	13 Orion
Unsupported Supported Latest version Future version

2011, due to disagreements in the former ADempiere developer community they decided to use the new name iDempiere for the code path with the new OSGi architecture. So iDempiere can be seen as the next generation of ADempiere or as a fork of the ADempiere Branch GlobalQSS Adempiere361. The majority of the active developer community started to work on iDempiere.

The big difference made on iDempiere 1.0 vs ADempiere was the platform technology upgrade to the OSGi framework that allows iDempiere to have plug-ins, so a lot of specific Code made on Adempiere have been updated as plug-ins in iDempiere., Also Jboss was replaced with Apache Tomcat improving the performance and memory footprint. Further upgrades were a new automatic build system based on Eclipse Buckminster, a major ZK upgrade (from ZK3.6 to ZK6) which allowed redesign of the web GUI.

2015, on version 3.1 Apache Tomcat was replaced with Jetty.

2017, on version 5.1 the ZK framework was updated to version 8.0.2.2 and Oracle was successfully tested for Oracle 12C.

2018, in version 6.1, OpenJDK was updated from version 8 to 10. The Eclipse Buckminster dependency for idempiere compilation changed to the maven tycho dependency.

2019, in version 6.2, OpenJDK was updated to version 11, the code was migrated from bitbucket/mercurial to GitHub/git one month before the release of version 7.1. New chat channels were implemented in Mattermost to replace the IRC channel for future discussions.

2023, in version 11, OpenJDK was updated to version 17

=== Awards and recognition ===
"Winner of InfoWorld's Bossie award for best open source software application", awarded in 2015 and 2016.

SourceForge - "Community Choice" Project of the Month in July 2016 and February 2018.

Computer Review (Russian web page) - The best "free" ERP-systems of primary, secondary and higher levels, 5 November 2015.

PCQuest - "7 Open Source ERP Software For Your Business", 20 May 2016.

Capterra Logistics Technology Blog - "The Top 8 Free, Open Source ERP Software", July 26, 2017.

== Platform ==
iDempiere consists of a Java server (based on a Jetty container) with a ZK 9.6 web GUI. It uses the OSGi framework for modularization. It has Oracle >=23ai and PostgreSQL >=14 database support.

It works as a web client software in Firefox, Chrome, Opera and Edge browsers that allow users to open related records quickly and easily via links.

== Key features ==
=== Application dictionary and customization ===
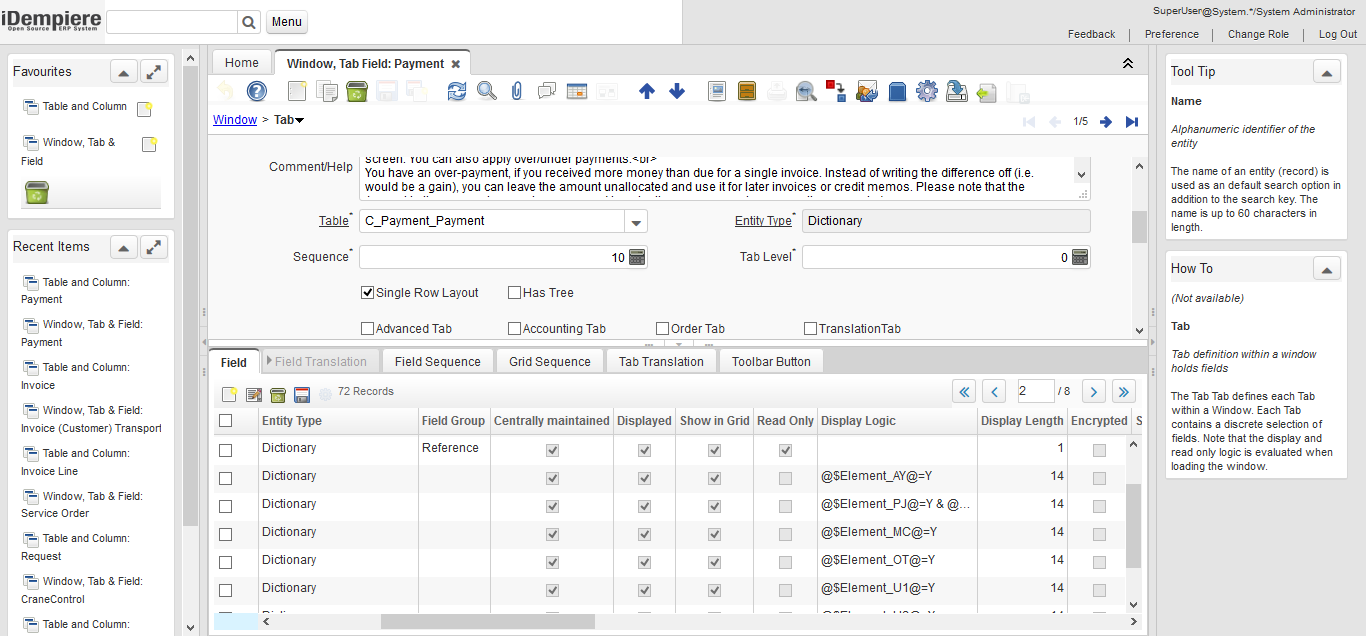
Application dictionary iDempiere

This is a feature of iDempiere that extends the concept of a data dictionary to an "Active Data Dictionary" that lets it manage entities, validation rules, windows, tables, formats, and other customizations of the application without new Java code. So iDempiere can be seen not only as an ERP but also as a platform to build database driven applications.

=== Plug-ins ===
The second feature of iDempiere are the plug-ins to modify or extend the ERP, CRM and SCM functionality. With the OSGi specification individual bundles of code (plug-ins) connect together in a dynamic way, the iDempiere-wiki allows users to rate the known plug-ins in the plugin market.

=== Workflows ===
iDempiere has a Workflow Engine based on WfMC standard, to manage document workflow process and BPM requirements.

=== Reports ===
iDempiere has a reporting format (with Application Directory) allowing zoom across data and export to a number of formats (PDF, HTML, Excel etc.), it also has integration with JasperReports for more complex reports.

=== Web services ===
Machine-to-machine communication is possible in XML file formats, the ERP has input and output templates of web service, allowing calls to the iDempiere server in any table, process or workflow.

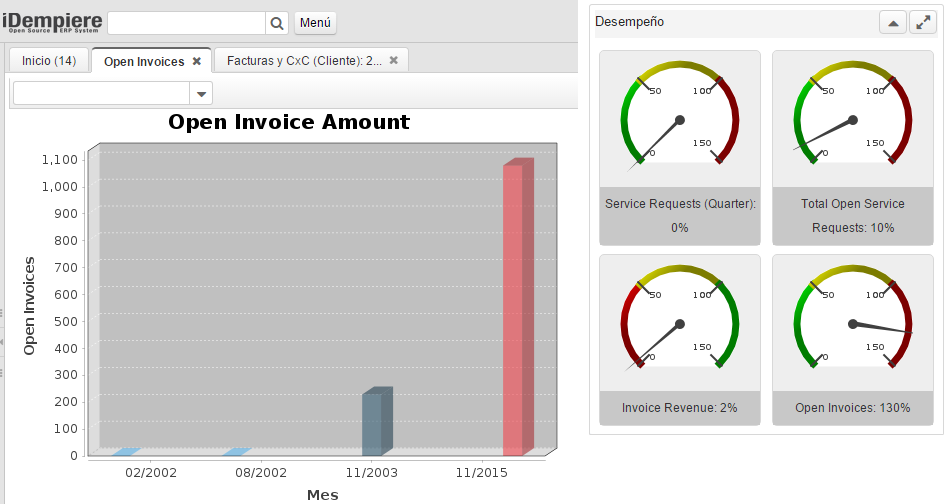
iDempiere performance indicators

=== Performance indicators ===
Performance graphs are set from measure calculation via Application Directory. Allowing to graphically see the fulfillment of business indicators or goals.

From the graphs you can access the data that generates them, (when you click on them, the corresponding data windows are opened with the information automatically filtered.

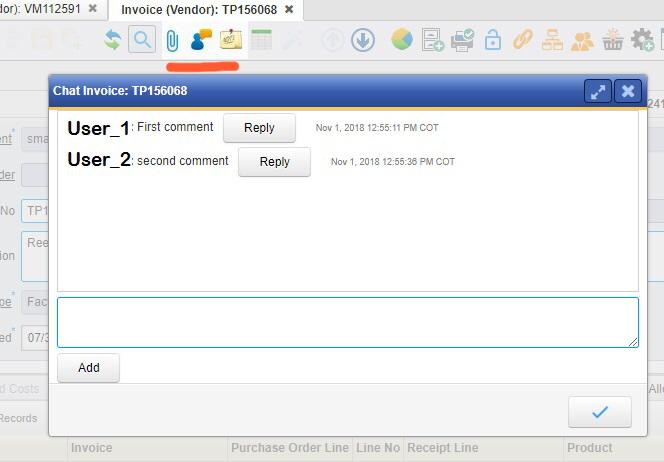

=== Attachments and comments ===
The system allows you to add attachments, comments in the form of chat and post-it for each of the records, in this way you can add unstructured information important for teamwork and improve the traceability of transactions.

=== System admin ===
Access to the system is based on roles and users, it is also possible to configure audit trails for the updated fields, in this way an audit process can be properly managed.

== Business functionalities ==
Business Processes included in CORE:

=== Operations ===
- Process: from quote to sales - Quotes, sale orders, sale Invoices, shipments, sales rep dashboard and sales reporting.
- Process: from requisition to purchase - Requisitions, purchase orders, purchase invoice, material receipt and purchase reporting.
- Supply chain management- Inventory, product planning, warehouse management and multiple location.
- CRM - Business partner rules, contact management, campaign management, sales management, sales stage, sales pipeline, marketing campaign and requests.
- Project management - project phases and task, materials management and expense report.

=== Financials ===
- Financial accounting - Management accounting, bank account management and reconciliation, payments management and financial reporting.
- Asset management - tracking, deliver assets, customer assets and depreciation.

=== Plug-ins ===
Some types of add-ons related to business processes are interactive BI dashboard, specific industry requirements (like asset maintenance, manufacturing and Kanban dashboard), localizations, and other software integrations (like Asterisk, Openbravo Pos, Google Maps).

== Community-powered ==
iDempiere is a project with a high activity, supported by a worldwide community of committed people organized as a decentralized bazaar. There is no single person or company ruling the project or many of the parts, much like the wiki websites, build server, trackers, forums, etc. The community includes end users, implementers and subject matter specialists.

There are active local communities in Japan, China, USA, Germany, Indonesia, Brasil, Malaysia, Colombia, India, Russia, and other countries. The community of people working with the software uses different tools to communicate around the world, such as Multi-language Project Wiki, Google forums and Mattermost channels. Wider reception comes also through speeches held in open source conferences like de:OpenRheinRuhr and in universities.

=== World conferences ===
- 2013 May 16/17 – Krefeld, Germany. Visited by about 30 core developers from 4 continents.
- 2014 March 7 – Bonn, Germany. (informal German iDempiere Conference).
- 2015 Sep 3/4 – Krefeld, Germany. Visited by about 38 core developers from 5 continents.
- 2019 Oct 31/Nov 1 – Lyon, France. Visited by about 52 core developers from 23 countries, 5 continents.
- 2023 February 22 & 23 - Manama, Bahrain. Visited by about 30 core developers/implementors/integrators from 18 different countries & 5 continents.

=== Development ===
The development environment (IDE) used for iDempiere is Eclipse with maven/Tycho, Git, Equinox ( OSGi ) and Apache Felix Web Console.

Idempiere uses Jira for bug/issue tracking, continuous integration and real-time collaboration, this way it integrates the contributions of the community.

== See also ==
- OSGI
- metasfresh (In the Compiere source code family)
- List of ERP software packages
- List of free and open source software packages
