= Fishbowl Inventory =

Utah-based software company

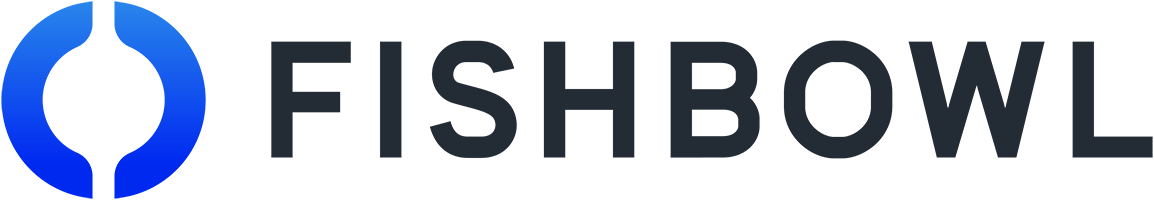
- Type: Private
- Industry: Software
- Founded: 2001; 25 years ago
- Headquarters: Orem, Utah, United States
- Products: Inventory Management Software
- Number of employees: 150 (January 2018)
- Website: fishbowlinventory.com

Fishbowl is a software company based in Orem, Utah. It develops and publishes Inventory management software that provides Inventory control features and integrates with accounting platforms such as Intuit QuickBooks and Xero.

== History ==
Fishbowl was founded in 2001 by Chuck and Beverly Hale. In 2004, David K. Williams was appointed CEO and Fishbowl released an inventory management tool integrated with QuickBooks and Xero.

In May 2011, Fishbowl's management and employees completed a buyout of the founders' stake, financed by Zions Bank.

In December 2021, Fishbowl was acquired by Diversis Capital, a private equity firm. Following the acquisition, Fishbowl began to acquire other companies. In 2022, it purchased Red Salt, its Australian distribution partner, to serve as its Asia-Pacific headquarters. In early 2023, Fishbowl acquired Sellware, a multi-channel e-commerce platform.

== Products ==
Fishbowl develops two main software products: Fishbowl Inventory and Fishbowl Manufacturing. Fishbowl Inventory provides businesses with real-time inventory tracking, order management, and warehouse tools. Fishbowl Manufacturing includes all features of Fishbowl Inventory, along with manufacturing-specific capabilities, and integrates with Intuit QuickBooks and Xero.
