= ERP5 =

Open source ERP based on Python and Zope

- Initial release: 2002
- Stable release: 5.5 / November 2014
- Repository: lab.nexedi.com/nexedi/erp5.git
- Written in: Python
- Operating system: Linux, Unix
- Type: ERP
- License: GPL
- Website: www.erp5.com

ERP5 is an open source ERP based on Python and Zope. It has the particularity of being based on a unified model to describe its implementation.

== Unified model ==
Whereas most ERPs are based on business field specific models and culture dependent ontologies, ERP5 uses a single model, called the Unified Business Model, that is used to describe all its components. This approach to enterprise modeling was introduced in 2002 by Smets and Carvalho. The UBM relies on 5 generic concepts, namely node, resource, movement, item and path. According to Carvalho, abstraction and genericity not only reduce the complexity of ERP5 systems but also increase code reuse incentive and sustainability. Thanks to this unification, a typical ERP5 implementation thus consists of 20 to 30 tables whereas the implementation of an ERP based on traditional enterprise modeling requires thousands to tens of thousands of tables because they need to piece together several components.

== History ==
ERP5 was created and is still mostly developed by Nexedi, an open source software publisher based in Lille (France), Dakar (Sénégal), Tokyo (Japan), Campos (Brazil) and Dresden (Germany). The first ERP5 implementation at Coramy, a midsize swimsuit manufacturer in the north of France, was awarded "Best ERP project" in 2004. Little information is provided by Nexedi about the companies that use ERP5, apparently as part of corporate policy to protect trade secrets. Notable public users are Airbus Defense and Space, BetEire Flow, Sénégal government and SANEF.

== Current status ==
The project has changed to a version control system in 2012 and used this transition to enforce quality and branch out certain components. Active research is currently being done on projects called jIO and RenderJs, both of which will contribute to a future responsive web interface of ERP5 that will include shifting part of the processes performed on the server to the client. In order to add discrete event simulation capabilities to ERP5 as well as to design future interface components, Nexedi is currently a contributing partner to an FP7 project. The recent adoption of ERP5 by large clients like Sanef to launch new services validates the projects recent development.

== Implementation process ==
The implementation process of ERP5 has been extensively researched and described through academic research. Campos and Carvalho describe the document oriented analysis approach which is considered for the implementation of large ERP5 systems in existing organizations. The ERP5 implementation process consists of collecting paper or electronic documents in the organization, mapping each terms and underlying concepts of each type of document to the UBM abstraction, and modeling the decision process materialized by signatures through document workflows. Unit tests, functional tests and performance tests are developed using built-in quality assurance frameworks in order to make sure that the implementation matches specified document oriented use cases and in order to prevent regressions.

This approach departs from data structure oriented modeling and from the idea that ERP implementation should at the same time change the processes of an organization and its information system. Rather than forcing organizations to adopt preset business processes, or so-called best practices provided by the ERP vendor, the ERP5 implementation process tries to capture efficient practices which are already implemented in the organization and map them to the UBM model. The risk of failure and the implementation costs of ERP implementation in large organizations are thus reduced through this approach. The ERP5 implementation process was successfully applied to the computerization of business processes of a Central Bank.

However, this implementation approach does not fit with the budget constraints of small companies or with the time constraints of newly created organizations. An alternative approach, based on Software as a Service, was later suggested by Carvalho and Johansson and implemented by SlapOS (previously TioLive LLC) which now provides ERP5 SaaS. Based on a small list of questions, which any CEO of a company can answer to in less than an hour, a standard ERP5 configuration is generated with preset business processes and custom nomenclatures (so-called categories in ERP5 terminology). This approach is now being automated with data mining and artificial intelligence tools.

A third alternative consisting of the combination of both approaches, namely the use of preset business processes and their extension at the core of ERP5, seems also possible but has not been covered yet by academic research.

== Innovations ==
Nexedi is part of multiple research projects and research clusters with a strong focus on cloud computing and on ERP5: Compatible, NEOPPOD, Geoblabla, Data Publica, TioSafe, EDOS, Systematic Paris-Region, Wendelin, Cython+.
