= Odoo =

Open source ERP, CRM and CMS

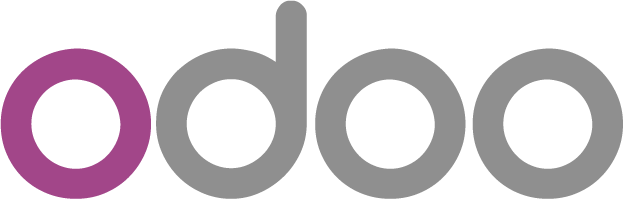

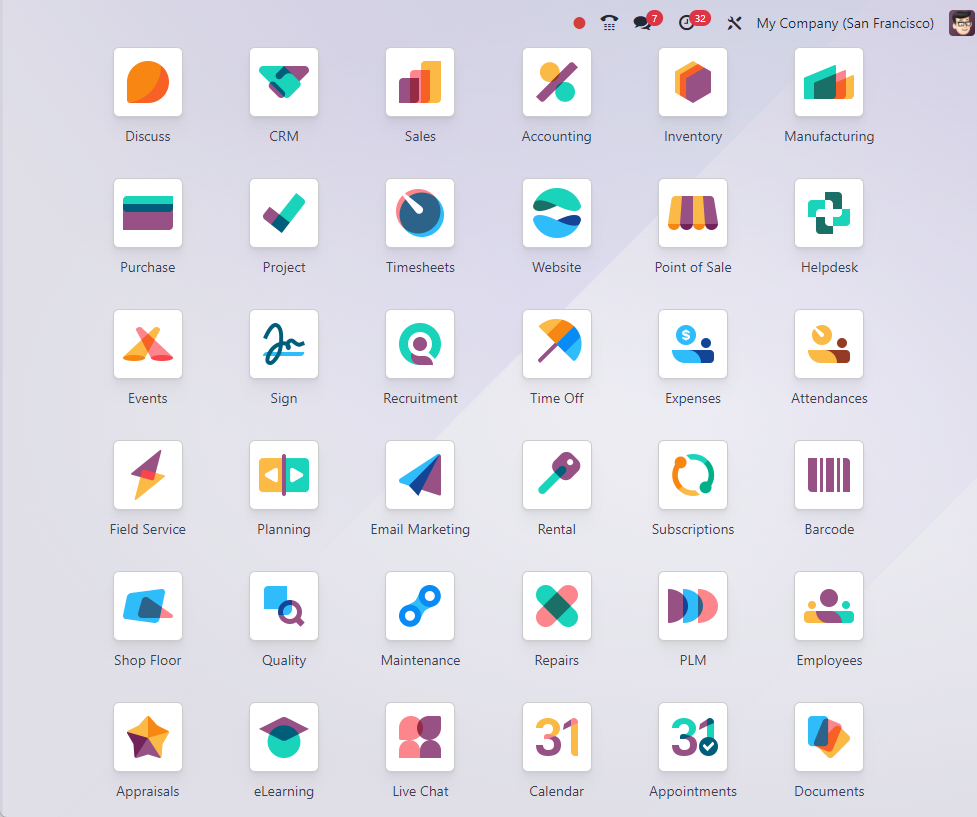
- Original author: Fabien Pinckaers
- Developers: Odoo S.A., Community
- Release: February 2005; 21 years ago
- Stable release: 20 / September 2026; 2 months ago
- Preview release: Master
- Written in: Python, JavaScript and TypeScript
- Operating system: Linux, Unix-like, macOS, Windows, iOS, Android, ChromeOS, ChromeOS Flex
- Type: ERP, CRM, Accounting, CMS, E-commerce
- License: "Community" version: GNU Lesser General Public License v3 "Enterprise" version: proprietary license
- Website: www.odoo.com
- Repository: github.com/odoo/odoo

Odoo is a business management software suite developed in Belgium. It provides applications for customer relationship management, e-commerce, accounting, manufacturing, warehouse management, project management, and inventory management. In October 2022, Odoo S.A. announced changes to its pricing structure, including a single per-user subscription plan for access to its applications. Odoo is available in two editions: Community, released under the GNU LGPLv3 license, and Enterprise, which contains proprietary applications and support services. The software can be deployed on-premises or provided through a software-as-a-service (SaaS) model.

== Overview ==
From its inception, Odoo S.A. (formerly OpenERP S.A.) released the core software as open-source software. Since the release of version 9.0, the company has operated under an open-core model that combines open-source software with proprietary enterprise applications and cloud-based SaaS offerings. In 2013, the non-profit Odoo Community Association was established to support collaborative development and use of the software.

Odoo has a modular architecture that allows third-party developers and organizations to create additional applications and extensions that can be distributed through its marketplace or shared publicly. The platform consists of a core framework, official applications developed by Odoo S.A., and community-developed modules. Odoo can also be integrated with external systems through third-party services and implementation partners.

Odoo has been used in university courses as part of teaching materials. A study on experimental learning suggested that Odoo (then known as OpenERP) can serve as an alternative to proprietary systems for educational purposes. Publications on Odoo include books covering topics such as accounting and software development.

=== Version support ===
Major Odoo releases (such as 19.0) are long-term support (LTS) versions. Minor releases are associated with the SaaS platform and are supported for a shorter period. Multiple LTS versions are supported in parallel, with older versions reaching end of life when new LTS releases are introduced. For example, versions 16.0 LTS, 17.0 LTS, and 18.0 LTS were supported concurrently, with 16.0 reaching end of life in September 2025 alongside the release of 19.0 LTS.

== History ==
In 2005, Fabien Pinckaers, the founder and CEO of Odoo, developed the software that later became TinyERP. In 2008, the software was renamed OpenERP. By 2010, the company employed more than 100 people. In 2013, Odoo received a Deloitte award recognizing company growth in Belgium. In 2014, the company changed its name from OpenERP to Odoo. According to the company, the name was selected in reference to the naming style of several internet companies at the time. In 2015, Inc. magazine included Odoo in its list of the 5,000 fastest-growing private companies in Europe.

In 2019, Odoo raised $90 million in investment funding. In 2021, reports stated that Odoo products were used by more than 5 million users or customers. That year, CEO Fabien Pinckaers said the company planned to expand its workforce, including additional hiring in software development roles. In 2023, Odoo reported revenue of €282 million, representing a 33% increase compared with the previous year, and stated that it employed more than 2,200 people. According to the report, the company remained profitable while continuing to expand its operations. In November 2024, Odoo secured $500 million in a secondary share round backed by CapitalG, Sequoia Capital, and BlackRock. The funding raised the company's valuation up to $5.26 billion.

== Features ==
Odoo is based on a modular software architecture. Its core components include:

- Website development
- eCommerce
- Customer relations management (CRM)
- Sales
- Point of sale (POS)
- Accounting
- Invoicing
- Expenses
- Document management
- Spreadsheets
- Digital signature
- Inventory management
- Manufacturing orders and BOM
- Purchase orders and tenders
- Human resources
- Marketing
- Project management
- Project planning

== Reception ==
Odoo is described in industry sources as a versatile enterprise resource planning (ERP) system. Prior to its rebranding, the software received several awards under the name OpenERP, including the Trends Gazelle, the Deloitte Technology Fast 50 Award, and InfoWorld’s BOSSIE Award in 2013, as well as in subsequent years following its rebranding to Odoo.

== See also ==
- Comparison of accounting software
- List of free and open source ERP packages
- List of free and open source software packages
- List of free and open source software packages concerning finance
