= Purchasing management =

Purchasing management is the management of the purchasing process and related aspects in an organization.

A purchasing management department can be formed and operated by one or more employees in order to ensure that all services, goods, supplies, and inventory needed for the organization to operate are ordered and kept in stock, as well as control inventory levels and costs associated with purchasing the items.

Purchasing management includes (and not only) the following expertise:

- Supplier Management
- Cost and Cost Reduction Management
- Ramp up / slow down Management
- Risk assessment
- Purchase Order Management

Purchasing Management (PM) can affect product cost. PM ensure all of the goods, supplies and inventory needed to operate the business are ordered and kept in stock. PM also control the cost of goods ordered, control inventory levels, build a strong relationship with vendors.

Objectives: 1. keep expense low 2. maintain and keep up to date of all transactions 3. avoid stock out situation 4. Send to the customer on the RIGHT quantity, quality, time, place, price, contract, transport, source and payment terms.
