= Transtek =

Transtek Systems
- Company type: Private Limited Liability Company
- Industry: Software & Programming
- Founded: Damascus, Syria (2000)
- Headquarters: Beirut
- Key people: Abdulsalam Haykal, Co-founder and CEO, Mohamed Haykal, Chairman, Husam Khaskieh, Chief Technology Officer
- Products: Compass ERP
- Number of employees: 200
- Website: http://www.transtek.com

Transtek Systems is a business software firm in the Middle East. Transtek System's flagship product is Compass ERP, a dual language (English-Arabic) enterprise resource planning system. According to the major Arab daily Al-Hayat, Compass ERP was the local alternative in Syria after US economic sanctions prohibited major international technology and ERP vendors to sell their products in Syria. Transtek System's Compass ERP package has an estimated 80% marketshare, also due to lack of competition. Another product that filled a gap created by sanctions was Compass AML, the first anti-money laundering system produced in the Arab World.

Transtek System's CEO Abdulsalam Haykal was named a Young Global Leader by the World Economic Forum in 2009.
