= Pronto Software =

Australian software company

Pronto Software Limited
- Type: Private
- Industry: Accounting & Business Software & Services
- Founded: Australia (1976)
- Headquarters: Burwood East, Victoria, Australia
- Key people: Chad Gates, Managing Director
- Products: Pronto Xi
- Number of employees: 475 (March 2023)
- Website: www.pronto.net

Pronto Software is an Australian enterprise software vendor.

Pronto Xi is Pronto Software's main product. It has modules for financials, retail, CRM, supply chain management, warehouse management, manufacturing and facilities management.

== History ==
The company was founded in 1976 as Prometheus Software Development in Sydney, Australia. Originally trading under the name 'Prometheus Software', the company was sold to Sausage Software in 1999. The name was then changed to 'Pronto Software' following a management buyout in 2002.

== Recognition ==
- 2006 Pronto Software named The Age/D&B Victorian Business of the Year. Launches PRONTO-Xi Phase 5
- 2007 Awarded IBM’s Reseller of the Year
- 2008 Won the D&B/The Age Business Awards (IT) and AIIA iAwards for Alert Intelligence
- 2009 Won the Australian Business Awards for Enterprise. Surpassed $50 million in turn over. Launches PRONTO-Xi Phase 6.
- 2011 Won the 2011 IBM Choice Award for Midmarket Leadership. Launches Pronto Xi Dimensions.
- 2015 Awarded 2015 ABA100 Winner in The Australian Business Awards for Best Software Product.
- 2016 ABA100 Winner for Cloud Innovation in The Australian Business Awards.

== Technology ==
In 1984, the company launched a suite of PRONTO Enterprise Management tools.

In 2005, the company launched PRONTO-Xi Phase 4.

In 2016, Pronto launched a digital consultancy service called Pronto Woven, a software complementary to Pronto Xi.

Pronto Xi runs on Linux (RedHat), UNIX (AIX or Solaris), or Microsoft Windows Server 2008. In Unix/Linux deployments, users access the application through a proprietary thin client application which connects to the server using SSH, Telnet, or SSL encrypted Telnet. Recent years have seen the introduction of a web client that is the basis of future development.

Supported databases are Informix Dynamic Server, Oracle, or SQL Server.

== Technology partners ==
Pronto Software is partnered with IBM, Remap, TIG Freight Management, ProSpend, Action HRM, Nomos One, Maralan Documentation, QBuild, Square, BundyPlus, Filebound Solutions, Ozedi and Finlease.

== Independent Consultants ==
There is a range of independent consultants not affiliated with Pronto Software servicing various industries. To date, Pronto software does not offer affiliation programs for independent consultants.
