= Quote to cash =

Ecommerce

Quote-to-cash (or QTC or Q2C) is an information technology term for the integration and automated management of end-to-end business processes on the sell side. The term is used for both internal orders and for vendor-managed inventory agreements.

It includes the following aspects of the sales process:

- Product (or Service) Configuration
- Pricing
- Quote creation for a prospect or customer or channel partner, and its negotiation
- Customer acceptance of the deal
- Product ordering and fulfillment
- Invoicing
- Payment receipt
- Renewals.

== See also ==
- Enterprise resource planning
