= Compass ERP =

Compass ERP is an Arabic-English, dual language Enterprise Resource Planning system, developed by Emirati company Transtek Systems, Dubai, United Arab Emirates. Compass ERP release 1.0 was launched in 2001. It's now at release 6.0. The company started in Syria in 2001.

Compass ERP includes 30 modules and submodules, including financial, human resources management, CRM, inventory, procurement, production, sales, labs, maintenance, and help desk.

Run on Oracle database, Compass ERP is one of few proprietary enterprise resource planning systems in the Middle East. It has implementations across that region and in major cities like Abu Dhabi, Dubai, Riyadh, Jeddah, Cairo, Amman, Muscat, Manama, and Doha.

In 2014, Compass Fixed Assets Management was the first module of Compass ERP to launch as a cloud SaaS system. It was launched in Dubai through an agreement with InfoFort, a subsidiary of Aramex, a global logistics firm listed in the Dubai Financial Market. Since then, Compass ERP has been completely migrated to a web-based, cloud-enabled system.

== See also ==
- Transtek
