= Abas ERP =

Enterprise resource planning software

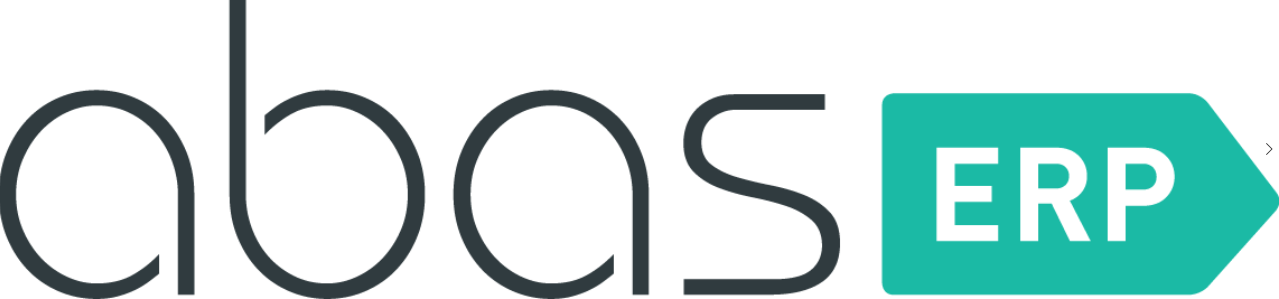
- Logo software abas ERP
- Original authors: Werner Strub and Peter Forscht,
- Developer: abas Software GmbH (Forterro)
- Initial release: January 1981; 45 years ago
- Stable release: 20 / 10 February 2021; 5 years ago
- Written in: FOP / Java / C / C++ / C#/ VB / VBA / SQL
- Operating system: Linux; Unix; Windows
- Platform: x86-64
- Available in: FOP / Java / C / C++ / C#/ VB / VBA /SQL
- Type: Software publisher
- License: Proprietary
- Website: http://abas-erp.com/en

Abas ERP is an enterprise resource planning (ERP) and e-business application for manufacturers such as those using make to order and other related sales models. It was developed by ABAS Software AG, in 1981 based in Karlsruhe, Germany.

Abas was sold to United Kingdom-based industrial software company Forterro in 2019.

== Architecture ==
The software uses a tiered software architecture built on an object-oriented database, an application layer, and a user interface. It can be accessed through standard database interfaces ODBC and SQL, APIs written in several common languages, a Java-based framework (AJO), and a simple proprietary 4GL language (FO).

abas ERP is bundled with a Liferay-based business portal and open-source reporting software JasperReports. SOAP services are available to exchange data with other business software.

== See also ==
- List of ERP vendors
- List of ERP software packages
