= Planet Soho =

- Developer: Avi Villiinger
- Operating system: Any (Web-based application)
- Type: Business Management Software
- License: Free service
- Website: www.planetsoho.com

Planet Soho was an American online company that addresses the needs of small office / home office businesses (SOHOs). It has over one million members from around the globe. The company was formerly called SohoOS. It officially changed its name and expanded its offerings on December 12, 2012.

== Features ==
Planet Soho aims to be a gathering place where SOHOs come together "to connect, collaborate, and create a new global micro-economy." The website currently has three main features.

SohoOS
SohoOS is an online business-management platform for SOHOs. It is the "flagship product" of Planet Soho Free features available on the SohoOS system include:

Contact Management	Invoicing	Time Tracking
Lead Generation	Inventory	Document Storage

Planet Soho Directory Planet Soho gives members a free listing in the Planet Soho Directory. Users can customize their page, adding contact information, logos, and content. The Directory features over one million SOHOs from around the world. Visitors can browse by location and service to find nearby small businesses.

Planet Soho Blog Planet Soho publishes original content daily, written by small-business experts, freelance writers, and Planet Soho users. Categories include How-To, Trends, Opinions, Success Stories, and Users' Journal.

== Press ==
Planet Soho and its signature product, SohoOS, have received favorable reviews from blogs and magazines including TechCrunch, GigaOM, and PC Magazine.

== History ==
=== Origins ===
SohoOS was founded in 2010. SohoOS received an initial investment of $550k from thetime and later on $1.75M in venture capital from Mangrove Capital Partners in January 2011. In January 2012, the company announced a second round of funding, totaling $8M, led by Morgenthaler Ventures.

In September 2011, SohoOS was picked as one of the top 20 Hot International Startups by

=== Current status ===
In December 2012, SohoOS reached one million users and rebranded as Planet Soho. The company also announced partnerships with FedEx Office, Go Daddy, Intuit, and Office Depot. However, the company decided to make the platform paying-members-only and thus signing its own death warrant as the new monetization model did not last long and by February 2014 the company has lost their audience and all of their money and was sentenced to dissolution. From over a million users down to around 2,000, the company now hopes to be able to pay some of its debts, as it has suffered a massive loss and declared bankruptcy.

== Additional Features ==
Customers to Cash In September 2012, SohoOS introduced a streamlined invoicing process that automatically tracks the status of estimates and invoices and notifies users when a client approves an estimate, views an estimate or invoice, sends a message, or makes a payment.

Command Center In October 2012, SohoOS added a browser toolbar, Command Center, that notifies users when they have leads, messages or status changes within their SohoOS account and contains shortcuts to popular features.

Soho Premium Planet Soho currently offers three bundles of enhanced business-management features: Soho More, Soho Even More, and Soho Unlimited. The monthly charge ranges from $4.95 to $6.95 per month. Features include:

Data Export	No Planet Soho Logos	Docs Storage	Essential Docs
Currency Converter	Premium Support	Premium Invoice Templates	
