= Greentree Business Software =

Software company based in New Zealand

Greentree International
- Type: Private
- Industry: Business software
- Founded: New Zealand (1984)
- Headquarters: Auckland, New Zealand
- Key people: Peter Dickinson, CEO; Harry Mowat, managing director UK
- Products: Integrated enterprise resource planning software
- Website: www.greentree.com

Greentree (now MYOB Greentree) is an ERP business software company based in Australia and New Zealand. The MYOB Greentree product is made for medium-sized organisations and distributed through a partner model.

Greentree is not industry vertical specific but provides capability across a wide range of market sectors. Its main markets are in Australia and New Zealand and growing in the UK, USA and the Pacific Islands.

Greentree operates in real-time and uses an integrated single design architecture which enables complete inter-module data flow.

== History ==
Greentree's origins go back to the 1980s, when it was developing DOS-based accounting software under the brand name CBA. For 14 years, CBA was the most successful mid-range financial software solution, used on more than 12,000 sites across New Zealand and Australia.

CBA was founded by Don Bowman and John Cowan in 1983. In less than a year, it became Australia's top microcomputer accounting software. In 1986, CBA was named Australia Business Software of the Year, outselling all other computer software providers according to an independent market survey.

In 1993, CBA was sold to US-based Platinum Software but was purchased back by the original developers in July 1997 under the name Focus Software. Focus Software and the Cardinal Group teamed up to develop the first application for the Jade programming language in 1998 and called it Greentree Business Software. It was a complete ground-up rewrite of CBA and was Microsoft Windows NT-based capable of running on standalone personal computers running Windows 95. Focus Software was subsequently named Greentree International in 1997.

Greentree International was named one of information technology world's "25 Rising Stars" by the MIS Magazine of Australia in 2006. The judging panel is made out of six IT industry stalwarts from various areas of expertise. Greentree Business software was a finalist for the 2010 Software Product of the Year (Client/Business category) for Accountancy Age Awards and in 2012, they were shortlisted again for The British Accountancy Awards Software Product of the Year.

In 2014, Greentree launched Greentree4 – its next-generation fully integrated ERP software platform which provides a browser-based user experience.

The platform streamlines the configuration and design of screens and forms so they can be customised at an organisation, group or individual level.

On 1 August 2016, MYOB acquired Greentree.

== Greentree GAME ON competition ==
In 2011, the company launched a competition for New Zealand and Australian businesses, under the banner GAME ON. Companies were invited to put a compelling case for winning a Greentree software implementation, including cloud hosting. Winners of the inaugural competition were hospitality and accommodation provider Kimberley Group (Australia) business and bathroom furniture manufacturer Smail & Co (New Zealand). In 2012, GAME ON was run in the UK, and won by charity organisation Concern Universal.

== Technology ==
Greentree is written in JADE which allows its implementers to write complex customised add-ons without causing any interference to the core product. It also allows customisations to stay synched and also provides continuous incremental upgrades.

Greentree is able to operate in the cloud, on local servers, or a combination of both.

Greentree launched a Software as a Service offering for its business management software in April 2016. Named Greentree as a Service (GaaS), it includes software, cloud hosting, maintenance and a range of other services.
