= Jeeves Information Systems =

Swedish software company or its chief product, an enterprise resource planning system

Jeeves
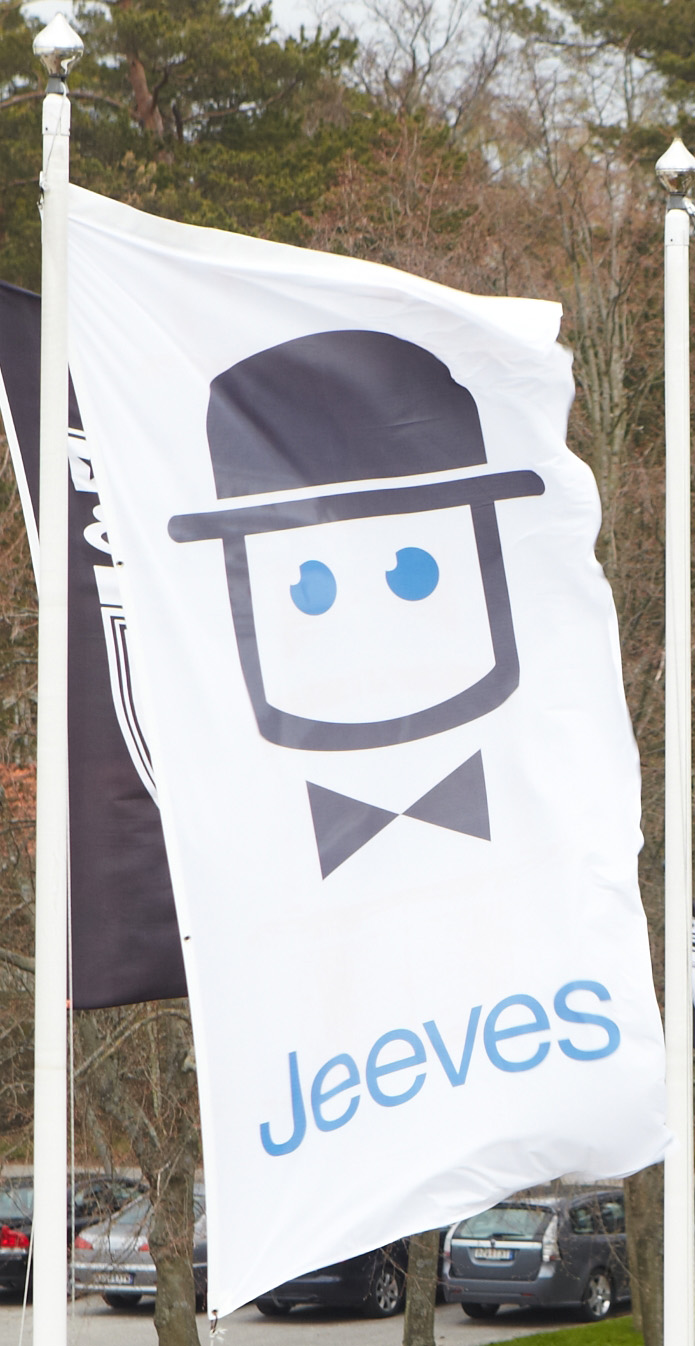
- Type: Public
- Industry: Computer software
- Founded: 1992; first system sold in 1993
- Headquarters: Stockholm, Sweden
- Products: ERP
- Revenue: SEK 177.000.000 SEK (2010)
- Owner: Battery Ventures
- Website: www.jeeveserp.com/en

Jeeves Information Systems, commonly known as Jeeves, is an enterprise resource planning (ERP) system and software developer in Sweden.

== History ==
Jeeves was founded at the beginning of the 1990s by a number of Swedish entrepreneurs. The head office is located in Stockholm. Jeeves was publicly traded on the Stockholm Stock Exchange from 1999 until 2012, when U.S.-based Battery Ventures acquired the company for $32.46 million. Their most famous product is Jeeves ERP, a business system (ERP system), which in 2004 was the most used business system in Sweden for companies with over 50 employees.

The ERP system is designed for companies within the retail, manufacturing and service sectors and has more than 30.000 users in over 40 countries. It was ranked Sweden's most popular ERP System by the analysis and consulting firm Exido's IT barometer in 2009. In 2015, the company had sales of SEK 444 million.
