= While You Were Out (cloud application) =

While You Were Out is an enterprise messaging and content management application, that allows an executive to receive his or her messages on a digital tablet device like the iPad. It is colloquially referred to as "WYWO" (pronounced Why-Woo).

== History ==
WYWO was originally developed in 1994 for the Zoomer, a PDA released by Palm Inc. and Casio. The screen looked and felt like the piece of paper that an executive was accustomed to. It used a user-friendly design that foreshadowed the advent of graphically rich applications like those that have been developed for the Apple iOS. Originally, "While You Were Out" was specified, designed, coded, and tested over a 256 character based paging network, While You Were Out has matured through mobile device platforms, wireless technology, and the worldwide adoption of the internet.

While You Were Out landing page

== Capabilities ==
- The "While You Were Out" application allows a user to capture and integrate messages from several sources in a single, organized, intuitive, and familiar interface. Messages can be forwarded as voice-mails, telephone calls, faxes, e-mails, text and picture messages, Twitter alerts, and Facebook updates, e-mails, faxes, or played back through text-to-speech technology.
- Users can attach files that may be relevant to that particular phone call, and can also view incoming faxes as attached PDFs.
- WYWO also features a call planning system named Make a Call. This feature enables a user to plan telephone calls, which are then automatically connected at the scheduled time.
