= Supply-chain-management software =

Type of business process software

Supply‑chain‑management software (SCMS) refers to software tools and modules used to execute supply chain transactions, manage supplier relationships, and control associated business processes. By automating operations across product development, sourcing, production, and logistics, SCMS can enhance both the physical and informational flows within a supply chain—ultimately driving better performance, lower costs, and increased efficiency.

While functionality in such systems is broad, it commonly includes:

1. Customer-requirement processing
2. Purchase-order processing
3. Sales and distribution
4. Inventory management
5. Goods receipt and warehouse management
6. Supplier management/sourcing

A requirement of many SCMS often includes forecasting. Such tools often attempt to balance the disparity between supply and demand by improving business processes and using algorithms and consumption analysis to better plan future needs. SCMS also often includes integration technology that allows organizations to trade electronically with supply chain partners.

== Shift to Software as a Service (SaaS) ==
SCMS adoption is growing faster than the broader enterprise application software market. The annual revenue from SCMS (on-premises and SaaS) reached $10 billion in 2014, a 12 percent increase over 2013.

While on-premises software was still more widely used than SaaS solutions for SCMS in 2014, Gartner projected that about two-thirds of the growth in SCMS adoption between 2015 and 2018 will be based on the SaaS subscription model: driven by a growing realization of the benefits of cloud-based services, the SaaS-based SCMS market grew by about 24 percent in 2014 and is projected to continue to grow at a 19 percent compound annual growth rate (CAGR), reaching $4.4 billion in annual sales by 2018.
