= Consona =

Software company

Consona Corporation
- Type: Private
- Industry: Software
- Founded: 2003; 23 years ago
- Defunct: August 7, 2012; 14 years ago
- Fate: Merged with CDC Software
- Successor: Aptean
- Headquarters: Indianapolis, Indiana; United States
- Area served: Americas, EMEA, Asia-Pacific
- Key people: Jeff Tognoni (CEO)
- Products: Enterprise software, including: ERP, CRM
- Owner: Battery Ventures; Thoma Cressey Bravo
- Number of employees: 700 (Approximate)
- Website: www.consona.com

Consona Corporation (formerly known as M2M Holdings Inc.) was a software company based in Indianapolis, Indiana. The company primarily sold enterprise software products to automate business tasks.

== Company history ==
Consona was founded in 1986 as Made2Manage Systems. In 2003, the venture capital firm Battery Ventures acquired and subsequently privatized Made2Manage Systems, then a publicly traded enterprise resource planning (ERP) software and services provider for small and midsize manufacturers.

== Mergers and acquisitions ==
Over the next three years, Consona acquired seven additional ERP product lines: DTR, Cimnet Systems, AXIS, Encompix, Intuitive, Relevant, and SupplyWorks. In 2005, Thoma Cressey, a private equity firm with software industry consolidation expertise, joined Battery as a secondary shareholder of Consona.

In 2006, the company entered the customer relationship management market when it acquired Onyx CRM. Seven months later, Consona acquired the KNOVA service and support knowledge management system and launched the company's Consona CRM division.

In early 2007, to avoid confusion between the Made2Manage ERP solution and the company, M2M Holdings, the company changed its name to Consona Corporation to represent its new position as a CRM and ERP software and service provider.

In 2008, Consona continued to acquire, adding former technology partner Configuration Solutions in March and creating Consona Canada via the purchase of the Intuitive-related assets of Automated Design Systems in June. Later in the year, Consona acquired several VAR-related assets in China, and launched Consona China.

In 2009, Consona acquired enterprise software assets of support automation software vendor, SupportSoft.

In 2010, Consona acquired open-source ERP software provider Compiere, giving Consona its first Cloud ready ERP solution and entry into the distribution market.

On August 7, 2012, Consona merged with CDC Software; the resulting company was renamed Aptean.
