= On-premises software =

Direct information article

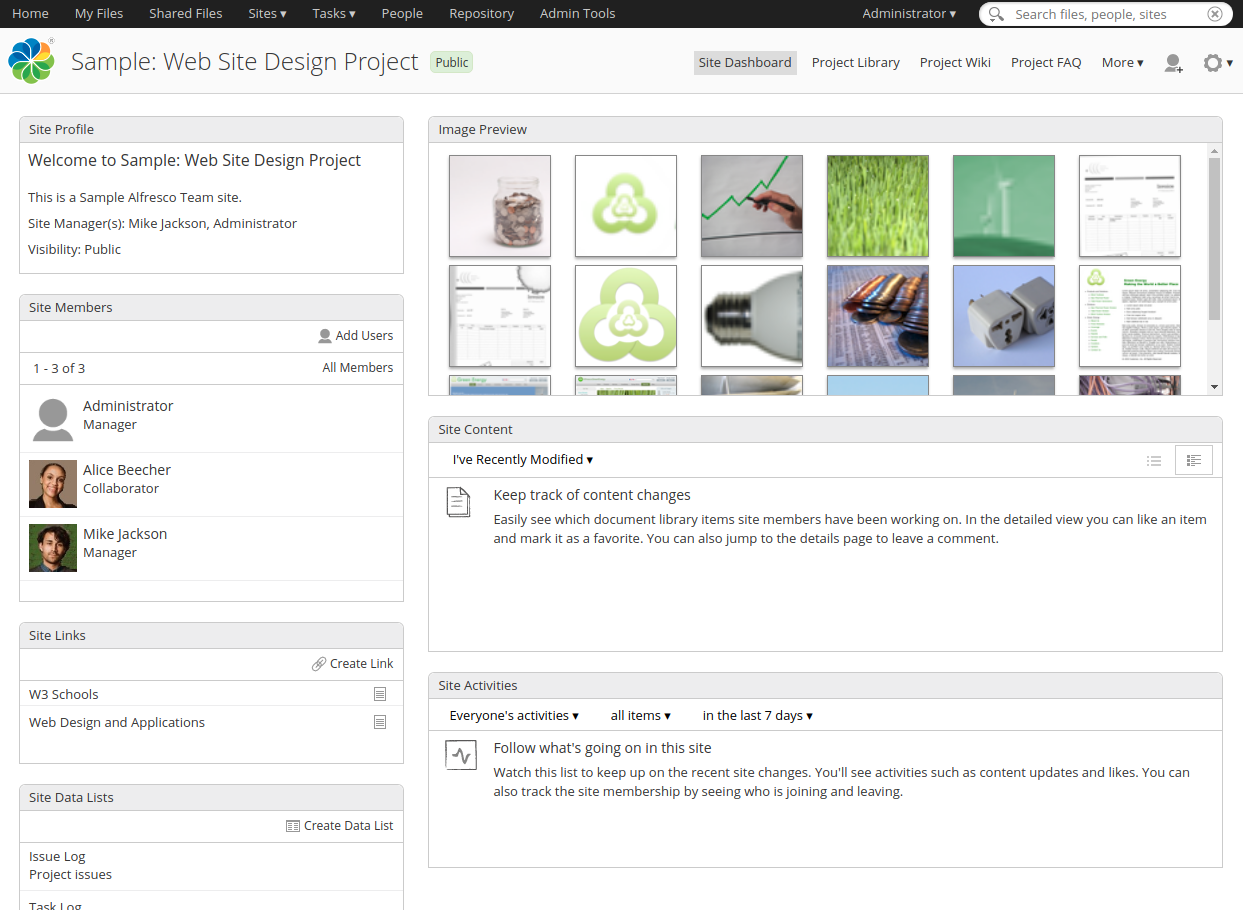
Alfresco, an example of on-premises document management software

On-premises software (abbreviated to on-prem, and often written as "on-premise") is installed and runs on computers on the premises of the person or organization using the software, rather than at a remote facility such as a server farm or cloud. On-premises software is sometimes referred to as "shrinkwrap" software, and off-premises software is commonly called "software as a service" ("SaaS") or "cloud computing".

The software consists of database and modules that are combined to particularly serve the unique needs of the large organizations regarding the automation of corporate-wide business system and its functions.

== Comparison between on-premises and cloud (SaaS) ==
=== Location ===
On-premises software is established within the organisation's internal system along with the hardware and other infrastructure necessary for the software to function.

Cloud-based software is usually served via internet and it can be accessed by users online regardless of the time and their location. Unlike on-premises software, cloud-based software users only need to install an application or a web browser in order to access its services.

=== Costs needed for access to services ===
For on-premises software, there are several costs expected to incur until the software and its services would be fully available for use. First of all, the construction of on-premises software within the organisation requires high initial costs, including costs incurred for the purchase of hardwares and other infrastructures as well as costs required for software installation and examination. In addition to this, the entity is entitled to the purchase of the license particular to the software, which involves costs and time for the preparation and required procedures. Furthermore, in order to maintain the software functionality, sustainable maintenance and operations are required and the entity will be subjected to the costs incurred for these as well.

On the other hand, in general, the initial costs required for the use of software services are considered relatively low for cloud-based software and thus suitable to small enterprises without a large amount of capital. Moreover, cloud-based software users are not subjected to license fees as well as maintenance and operation costs since these are on hands of software vendors. Furthermore, costs incurred for infrastructures are expected to be smaller compared to on-premises software as users only need their electronic devices to be able to get access to the services.

Although initial costs for the access to services are usually low for cloud-based software, total costs required for the use of software over a specific time period are unsure as cloud-based software requires routine payment (i.e. monthly subscription fee) for the use of services whereas on-premises software does not.

=== Operation and maintenance ===
The entity using on-premises software are fully responsible for the daily operation and maintenance of the system by itself. This results in more time and costs required for the system operation as well as IT personnel who have specialization in managing the system.

On the other hand, for cloud-based software, it is a software provider who is responsible for the system operations and maintenance. Thus, no IT professionals need to be hired within the entity specifically for the purpose of operating the software.

=== Backup and data storage ===
As for the maintenance and operations, the entity using on-premises software is also responsible for backup and storage of software data. This implies the ability of the entity to have a full control over its data and its security.

For cloud-based software, the entity has no requirement of data backup by itself, as this is also a responsibility of the software provider and data backup is perquisite for the provider in offering their services. On the other hand, the control of data by software providers suggests that users have no control over the data and software system performance. This may result in some security issues, especially for those who are subject to high level of regulation standards against data security, such as financial institutions.

=== Data security ===
As discussed, users are responsible of data management for on-premises software while for cloud-based software, the responsibility is on the software provider.

However, the difference in the level of safety over data security between on-premises and cloud-based software is arguable. Some experts claim that cloud-based software is likely to be more secure as they have more amount of capital and other resources to invest in data security system than normal business entities. While others argue that this is questionable as software vendors are usually more exposed to being targeted by cyberattacker as they hold vast amount of data within the system.

== Development of software from on-premises to cloud-based ==
On-premises software was invented first mainly for the purpose of corporate-wide process automation of large entities before the evolution of cloud-based software, SaaS.

SaaS emerged in the early 2000s, and some of businesses that published SaaS products have experienced a failure, as customers wanted SaaS particularly for the purpose of the automation of single specific corporate functions rather than a corporate-wide system.

However, the idea of on-demand service delivery of software was not revolutionary at the time of 2000. Some vendors already had attempted this delivery style of software service in 1900s. The reason the business model was not widely known at that time was the lack of broadband penetration and that there was no sufficient internet accessibility to effectively make all the on-demand software service work effectively.

As SaaS market evolved in the 2000s, as opposed to on-premises software, the cloud-based software got adopted by the market demand to serve many types of businesses, including small and large corporations, and to automate specific business processes within them.

In addition, SaaS allowed customers to make selections among many functions depending on each customer's needs and economic conditions.

Although on-premises software previously had the huge advantage of being capable of customization and tailoring software services to each business needs, SaaS has also evolved as a platform where customizable services are available to some extent as cloud-based software market develops.

On-premises software was prevailing in 2013 in the software market, however, more and more customers and thus software vendors are shifting toward cloud-based software.

Key corporate players who have contributed to this software model change as well as associated ERP systems are:

- Oracle
- Sage
- Microsoft
- SAP
- Salesforce

For instance, SAP was originally an on-premises software vendor. In accordance with the change in technologies and customer preferences in the software market, the company has turned itself into cloud-based ERP provider that are available both in public cloud and private clouds depending on the customer's needs.

Microsoft previously provided on-premises collaborative platforms such as SharePoint 2010 for automation of corporate-wide business system of large corporations. In the recent years the company has been publishing many cloud-based piece of software such as Azure and Microsoft Dynamics LCS that provide customers internet services that offer automated and standardized business functions for specific area of the businesses.

Salesforce offers a business CRM process through its cloud-based software service, including Sales Cloud that offers standardized business processes regarding the customer relation to the businesses.

== Current software market condition ==
=== General market trend ===
Over the last decade of software market, an increasing trend toward cloud-based software from traditional on-premises software has been appeared with an acceleration to its speed.

At the time of 2016, despite this trend, most of corporations maintained their traditional information management system through on-premises software. This suggested that the trend shift in software market is occurring with a slow pace as the businesses are gradually shifting their software system from the traditional on-premises to cloud-based.

In 2020, approximately 70% of business customers are planning new or further transitions from on-premises software to cloud-based software.

In accordance to this consumer movement toward cloud-based solutions in software market, more and more vendors, including industry leading software corporations such as Microsoft, Oracle and SAP, shift their business model and transfer their products to cloud-based solutions.

=== Pace of market adaptation ===
==== Type of customers ====
Faster shift from on-premises to cloud-based is expected in B2C market than B2B market.

This is because businesses usually require much more complex structure and system of information management in contrast to private users. In addition, businesses are more prudent to the shift of its software system because they have significant concern over the data security as its failure could potentially result in the loss of enormous amount of data as well as the business's reputation.

==== Business model ====
Primary customers for relatively new software, SaaS, were the non-users of on-premises software as it was easier for them to make the purchase, installation and implementation of its service due to the factors previously discussed such as the lower installation cost and the lower system management cost.

The adoption of cloud-based software by businesses has increased. Software as a service (SaaS) is used in industries with standardized business processes.

==== Legislation and restriction ====
Another factor resulted in the difference of the pace of market adaptation toward cloud-based software was the degree of concern and legislation regarding data security. In fact, developing economies where subjected to less restrictions regarding data security and legacy management, showed a relatively quicker response to the software market trend shift.

==== Vendors' reaction (supply-side) ====
Some vendors, particularly for those who have originally been offering on-premises software, are not willing to shift their software service to cloud-based as they will need to change their business model entirely and this requires a large amount of cost, time and efforts. Besides the demand-side (or customer-side) factors above, this vendor reaction could be another reason for the slow migration toward cloud-based services in software market.

=== Impact of trend change ===
The movement toward cloud-based software not only implies the change in business's information management system but also result in potential change in their value creation processes.

==== Change in the role of the platform ====
Cloud-based platform incorporates the functionality of facilitating the interactions and communications among customers and producers due to its feature of being accessible from various stakeholders at the same time, while on-premises software usually limits the access to its platform owner in exclusion to other group of individuals.

==== Variety of on-platform services ====
Cloud-based software provides the software services in relatively more flexible way and with more variations. The reason of this exists in the architecture of cloud-based software platform that consists of a number of different platforms with different specialty and functions. The most representative example of such platform is Microsoft Azure. The software consists of a number of distinct business platforms.

== Integration of on-premises and cloud-based ==
As discussed above, on-premises solution and cloud-based solution have both positive and negative sides respectively. Thus, the 'better' choice among 2 software depends on many factors, for instance, customer's business model, financial status and business strategy. However, neither choice would provide customers the perfect solutions as both software do not offer full functionalities to its users.

In transition to cloud-based solution for the information management, customers' concern involves the security of data, privacy, and many more that may be better provided by the traditional on-premises solution. In order to deal with this problem, the software market came up with new solution to combine on-premises and cloud-based solution and its best features. As such, the software will be provided on-demand with customization simultaneously.

== Software industry ==
=== History and evolution ===
Software has begun evolving from the beginning of 1990s and there was a big movement in business market trend toward the use of software at the beginning of 2000s. Although, during these periods, IT industry as a whole was in the middle of market boom and experienced a rapid growth in its market size, software market accounted for nearly 25% of all the spending in IT industry products.

According to Hietala's research, US has been always the biggest country player in the software business and has been presenting a dominant market position in the market. In 2006, software products of US companies occupied around 60% of the whole world software product turnover. sa..

=== Software product types ===
There are mainly 3 types of software product from the function point of view and from a commercial perspective:

1. Pure software product
2. Embedded software product
3. Customer-tailored software

Pure software is mainly sold or purchased on its own as one independent product and not being incorporated into other products. Although these software are traded as main product, sometimes vendors get more revenue stream from services that are combined with or offered on the software platform.

Unlike pure software product, embedded software products are not traded on its own but rather considered as a part being incorporated in other products. The examples are the software embedded into the mobile phone, computer and other electronic devices. In general, completely different ways of architecture and system construction needed for this type of software compared to that of traditional software products.

Customer-tailored software are the software of which the system and the service can be tailored to individual needs of customers. This customization can be achieved through a variety of different combinations of software modules and platforms. The core purpose of this software product is to solve a specific business issues of individual customers and provide a unique solution to that through technology. While standard cloud-based software usually offer standardized solution and service to a broad range of customers within an industry and/or market area.

== See also ==
- Client (computing)
- Self-hosting (web services)
