= Infor =

American software company

- Type: Subsidiary
- Industry: Enterprise software
- Founded: June 2002; 24 years ago
- Headquarters: Atlanta, United States
- Area served: Worldwide
- Key people: Kevin Samuelson (CEO)
- Revenue: ▲US$3.2billion (2019)
- Number of employees: 17,000 (2022)
- Parent: Koch Industries
- Website: www.infor.com

Infor is a multinational company headquartered in Atlanta that provides industry-specific, enterprise software, licensed for use on-premises or as a service.

After being acquired in 2020, the company became a subsidiary of Koch Industries.

Customers include Bausch & Lomb, Heineken, Flextronics, Wyndham Hotels, Benetton Group, Boskalis, EBSCO, Legacy Health, and Best Western International.

== History ==
Infor was spun out from Malvern, Pennsylvania based Systems & Computer Technology Corp in June 2002, as Agilisys, when there were 1,300 customers of its process manufacturing ERP software. It grew through acquisitions backed by Golden Gate Capital and Summit Partners.

With the addition of German company Infor Business Solutions AG in 2004, Agilisys changed name to Infor Global Solutions. It relocated its headquarters from Alpharetta, Georgia to New York in 2012.

=== Micro-verticals and cloud ===
From 2010, Infor marketed "micro-verticals," which were versions of its software adapted for specific industries. It claimed these products were easier to implement than those of its competitors.

Infor introduced an Amazon Web Services based product called CloudSuite in 2014.

In April 2026, Infor and Amazon Web Services announced a collaboration to deliver industry-specific AI agents for manufacturing and distribution enterprises, built natively on AWS infrastructure, targeting workflows including inventory management, financial operations, and quality management.

=== Koch Industries ===
In February 2017, Koch Equity Development LLC invested $2.68 billion in Infor, for a two-thirds ownership.

Subsequently, in February 2020, Koch bought out Golden Gate Capital's remaining minority shareholding. The transaction valued Infor's assets at $11 billion. By then Infor was the world's third-largest enterprise software vendor after Oracle Corporation and SAP, with 6% of the market.

== Philanthropy ==
In 2013, the company was recognized as a Computerworld honors laureate for its work with Habitat for Humanity, partnering with the organization to provide software at free or reduced prices. Through Habitat for Humanity, Infor employees also participate in a Volunteer Build Program, Employee Giving Campaign, and Annual Global Village Build.

The company sponsors the Leukemia & Lymphoma Society's “Light the Night Walks” events, held in years such as 2012.

Infor has supported the United Negro College Fund's A Mind Is a Terrible Thing to Waste event.

== Awards ==
- 2014 – CODie Awards, Best Healthcare IT Solution
- 2014 – CODie Awards, Best Social Business Solution
- 2015 – Confirmit Achievement in Customer Excellence Award (for seventh year)
- 2015 – Stevie Awards, People's Choice for Favorite New Products
- 2016 – Plant Engineering, Energy Performance Management and Maintenance Software Products of the Year

== See also ==
- List of ERP software packages and vendors
