= Openbravo =

Spanish cloud-based software provider

- Company type: Private
- Industry: Software
- Headquarters: Pamplona, Spain
- Number of locations: 7 offices
- Area served: Worldwide
- Products: Openbravo Commerce Cloud
- Services: Implementation, support, training, cloud

Openbravo is a Spanish software company headquartered in Pamplona, Spain, that develops cloud-based software primarily for retail organizations.The company originally developed open-source enterprise resource planning (ERP) software for multiple industries before shifting its focus to retail solutions.

== History ==
Openbravo's roots are in the development of business administration software, first developed by Nicolas Serrano and Ismael Ciordia, employees of the University of Navarra in the mid-1990s who used emerging internet technologies in their work, and later applied web-based technologies to the development of business administration software. Their concept was realized in a new company called Tecnicia, founded in August 2001 by Serrano, Ciordia, and Aguinaga. In 2005, two management consultants, Manel Sarasa and Josep Mitjá, were asked by a venture capital company to evaluate Tecnicia and prepare a business plan for its evolution. In 2006, the two consultants joined Tecnicia as the CEO and COO, respectively. Around the same time the Spanish investment company Sodena invested US$6.4 million in the further development of the company.

In 2006, the company was renamed Openbravo and launched its first product offering, Openbravo ERP. The code was made available open-source in April that same year. In 2007, the company announced the acquisition of LibrePOS, a Java-based Point-of-Sale (POS) application for retail and hospitality businesses. LibrePOS was rebranded as Openbravo POS (or Openbravo Java POS). In May 2008 Openbravo attracted three more investors, Amadeus (UK), GIMV (Belgium) and Adara (Spain) for a second investment round totaling $12.5 million to further develop its products and services.

In July 2012, Openbravo launched Openbravo for Retail, including the Openbravo Web POS, a new point-of-sale platform replacing Openbravo Java POS that was web and mobile-friendly.

In March 2014, Openbravo ERP was renamed Openbravo ERP Platform. Openbravo for Retail was renamed to Openbravo Commerce Platform.

In May 2015, the Openbravo Commerce Platform and Openbravo ERP Platform were renamed to Openbravo Commerce Suite and Openbravo Business Suite. Openbravo announces its strategic focus in Retail. Openbravo also launches the Openbravo Subscription Management and Recurring Billing, a specialized solution for recurring transactions-based revenue models.

In February 2016, Openbravo launches Openbravo Cloud, its official cloud offering, and starts the distribution of Openbravo Commerce Cloud, a cloud-based and mobile-enabled omnichannel platform for midsize to large retail and restaurant chains.

In 2018, Openbravo announces a certified SAP connector to facilitate the integration of the Openbravo Commerce Cloud in all those clients running SAP as their central corporate system.

In November 2022 Openbravo joins the French group DL Software, today Orisha. As a result Openbravo becomes Orisha | Openbravo in October 2023.

== Current products ==
Openbravo currently distributes Openbravo Commerce Cloud, a cloud-based software platform used by retail organizations to manage point-of-sale, inventory, and order management processes across multiple sales channels.

== Previous products (discontinued) ==
Since its appearance in the market in 2006, Openbravo has launched different products that help to describe the evolution of the company. The following information is shown for historical purposes only, since all these products are no longer offered.

=== Openbravo ERP ===
Openbravo ERP was the first product launched by Openbravo. It was a web-based enterprise resource planning software for small and medium-sized companies that is released under the Openbravo Public License, based on the Mozilla Public License. The model for the program was originally based on the Compiere ERP program that is also open-source, released under the GNU General Public License version 2. As of January 2008, the program was among the top ten most active projects of SourceForge.

Openbravo ERP was designed to support common business processes such as sales, procurement, finance, and manufacturing for small and medium-sized enterprises. The software supported optional commercial extensions and paid editions offering additional administrative and support features. The application featured a web-based user interface accessible through standard web browsers.

Openbravo's Java-based architecture focuses on two development models:

- model-driven development, in which developers describe the application in terms of models rather than code
- model-view-controller, a well-established design pattern in which the presentation logic and the business logic are kept isolated

These architectural approaches supported modular development and integration with other software systems. Openbravo ERP supported integration with selected third-party open-source business applications.

In March 2014, Openbravo ERP was renamed to Openbravo ERP Platform, which was changed again to Openbravo Business Suite in May 2015. The latest version is 3.0.36902 released in April 2020.

=== Openbravo Java POS ===
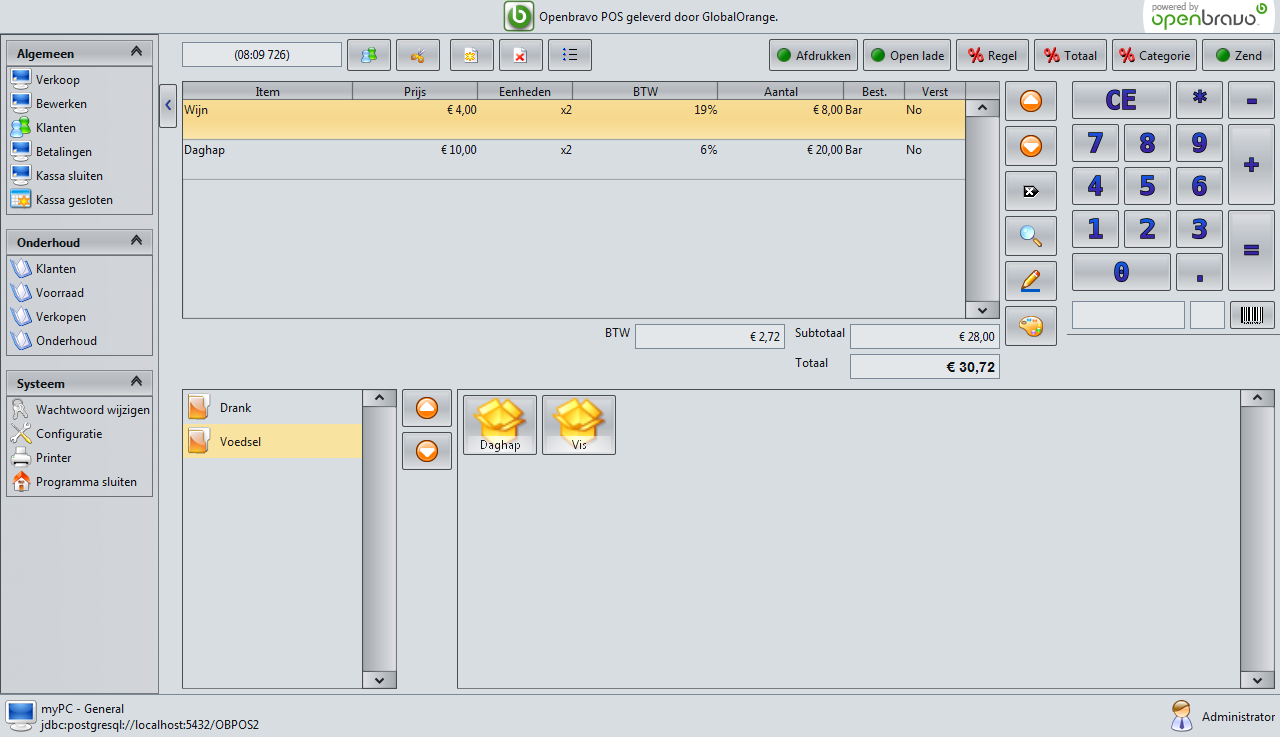
Interface Openbravo POS

Openbravo POS was the first POS solution offered by Openbravo. It is a Java Point-of-Sale (POS) application for retail and hospitality businesses. The application came into existence called TinaPOS. For legal reasons the application was renamed to LibrePOS. In 2007 LibrePOS was acquired by Openbravo and it is known by its current name. The program was completely integrated into Openbravo ERP. Through this integration it was possible to update stock levels, financial journals and customer data directly in the central database when a POS sales is executed in the stores. Openbravo POS can be applied using PDAs for order intake. In July 2012 Openbravo launched its new POS solution, the Openbravo Web POS, included in the Openbravo Commerce Suite and which replaced the Openbravo Java POS. Openbravo Java POS has been discontinued.

=== Openbravo Business Suite ===
The Openbravo Business Suite was launched in May 2015, replacing the previous Openbravo ERP Platform. It is a business management software suite built on the Openbravo Technology Platform including horizontal ERP, CRM and BI functionality for across industries.

=== Openbravo Commerce Suite ===
A commercial software product designed for organizations using recurring billing revenue models. It is a retail management software suite supporting multiple sales channels.

=== Openbravo Subscription Management and Recurring Billing ===
A commercial software for companies with recurring billing revenue models, including functionality from pricing definition to automatic revenue recognition and accounting.

=== Openbravo Commerce Cloud ===
The current version of the Openbravo software provides a cloud-based SaaS unified commerce platform for midsize to large retail chains.

== See also ==
- Omnichannel
- Software as a service
- Cloud computing
- OMS
- Warehouse management system
