= Comparison of accounting software =

The following comparison of accounting software documents the various features and differences between different professional accounting software, personal and small enterprise software, medium-sized and large-sized enterprise software, and other accounting packages. The comparison only focus considering financial and external accounting functions. No comparison is made for internal/management accounting, cost accounting, budgeting, or integrated MAS accounting.

== Free and open source software ==
Package	License	Windows	macOS	Linux	Market focus	General ledger	Accounts receivable / payable	Double-entry bookkeeping	Multi-currency pricing	Online banking	Point of sale	E-commerce	SOCT	Payroll	Enterprise resource planning	CRM	Business intelligence	Human resource management	Manufacturing / Bill of materials	Supply chain management	Inventory management	Records management	Distribution / WMS	Multi-user	Multi Co	Tax return	Other features	Structure	Programming language and database
Adempiere	GPL	Yes	Yes	Yes	Mid-market	Yes	Yes	Yes	Yes		Yes	Yes		Yes	Yes	Yes	Yes	Yes	Yes	Yes	Yes		Yes	Yes	Yes		SaaS, project management	Web app, client–server	Java, Oracle Database, PostgreSQL
Apache OFBiz	Apache License	Yes	Yes	Yes	Small to mid-sized enterprises	Yes	Yes	Yes	Yes		Yes	Yes			Yes	Yes	Yes	Yes	Yes	Yes	Yes		Yes	Yes	Yes	Yes	SaaS, digital calendar, webmail	Web app, cloud computing	Java
Compiere	GPL version 2, other proprietary	Yes	Yes	Yes	Mid-market						Yes				Yes	Yes			Yes				Yes				MES	Web app	Java
Dolibarr	GPL	Yes	Yes	Yes	Small to mid-sized enterprises	Yes	Yes	Yes	Yes		Yes		Yes		Yes	Yes		Yes					Yes	Yes	Yes		SaaS	Web app	PHP
ERPNext	GPL version 3	Yes	Yes	Yes	All enterprises	Yes	Yes	Yes	Yes	?	Yes	Yes	?	?	Yes	Yes	?	Yes	Yes	Yes	Yes	Yes	Yes	Yes	Yes	?	SaaS, on-prem	Web app	Python
GnuCash	GPL	Yes	Yes	Yes	Personal and small enterprise	Yes	Yes	Yes	Yes	Yes			Yes											No		ltd		Stand-alone	C, Scheme
iDempiere	GPL version 2	Yes	Yes	Yes	Mid-market	Yes	Yes	Yes	Yes		Yes	Yes		Yes	Yes	Yes	Yes	Yes	Yes	Yes	Yes		Yes	Yes	Yes		SaaS, project management, digital calendar	Web app, client–server	Java, Oracle Database, PostgreSQL
JFire	GPL	Yes	No	Yes	All enterprises			Yes			Yes				Yes	Yes							Yes					Web app, Stand-alone	Java
LedgerSMB	GPL	Yes	Yes	Yes	Mid-market	Yes	Yes	Yes	Yes	Yes	Yes				Yes	Yes	Yes		Yes	Yes	Yes		Yes	Yes	Yes	Yes	SaaS, manufacturing (light industry), Multi-language (40),	Web app	Perl
Ledger (CLI)	BSD	Yes	Yes	Yes	Personal and small enterprise	Yes	Yes	Yes	Yes	No	No	No	No	No	No	No	No	No	No	No	No	No	No	No	No	No	Can be used with git	Plain text file-based	C++
metasfresh	GPL version 2	Yes	Yes	Yes	Mid-market	Yes	Yes	Yes	Yes		Yes	Yes		Yes	Yes	Yes	Yes	Yes	Yes	Yes	Yes		Yes	Yes	Yes		SaaS, on-prem	Web app, client–server	Java, PostgreSQL
Odoo (CE)	LGPL3	Yes	Yes	Yes	All enterprises	Yes	Yes	Yes	Yes		Yes	Yes			Yes	Yes		Yes	Yes	Yes	Yes	Yes	Yes	Yes	Yes		SaaS, on-prem	Web app	Python
SQL-Ledger	GPL	Yes	Yes	Yes	Mid-market	Yes	Yes	Yes	Yes		Yes				Yes				Yes		Yes			Yes	Yes			Web app	Perl
Tryton	GPL	Yes	Yes	Yes	Low to mid-market	Yes	Yes	Yes	Yes	Yes		Yes			Yes	Yes			Yes	Yes	Yes		Yes	Yes	Yes	Yes		Web app, client–server, thin client	Python

== Proprietary software ==
Package	License	Windows	macOS	Linux	Market focus	Type	Structure
24SevenOffice	Software as a Service	Yes	Yes	Yes	Low to mid-market	Enterprise resource planning (ERP), customer relationship management (CRM), project management, webmail, collaboration, Integrated VoIP	Web app
Acumatica	Proprietary and Software as a service	Yes	Yes	Yes	Mid-market	ERP, CRM, project management, webmail, Integration, Notification, Employee	Web app
AME Accounting Software	Proprietary	Yes	No	No	Low to mid-market	General ledger, accounts receivable (AR), accounts payable (AP), double-entry bookkeeping, payroll, Small Business Accounting	Stand-alone
Aplos Software	Proprietary	Yes	Yes	Yes	Low to mid-market nonprofit and faith-based organizations	General ledger, AR, AP, double-entry bookkeeping, fund accounting, nonprofit organization accounting, online fundraising	Web app
Baan Corporation	Proprietary	Yes	Yes	Yes	Mid to Low-market	ERP	Web app, stand-alone
CODA	Proprietary	Yes	No	Yes	Mid-market	General ledger, AR, AP, Analytics; Integration; etc.	Web app, stand-alone
Comarch Altum	Proprietary	Yes	No	No	Low to mid-market	General ledger, AR, AP, double-entry bookkeeping, point of sale (POS), e-commerce, ERP, CRM, business intelligence (BI), bookkeeping, Multi-Currency, Multi-Language, analytics; Integration; Workflow; Retail	Web app, stand-alone
FinancialForce.com	Software as a Service	Yes	Yes	Yes	Mid-market to enterprise	General ledger, AR, AP, ERP, ordering & billing, cash management, reporting & dashboarding, multi-currency, multi-company, global tax, analytics	Web app
FlexAccount	Proprietary	Yes	No	No	Mid- to high-end market	ERP, manufacturing, intercompany, Multicurrency, Budgeting, Reporting, Analysis	Web app, stand-alone
FreeAgent	Software as a Service	Yes	Yes	Yes	Freelancers and Microbusiness	Double-entry bookkeeping, payroll, tax return, project management, small business accounting, time tracking, invoicing, expense management, bank feeds, stock	Web app
FreshBooks	Software as a Service	Yes	Yes	Yes	Small Businesses (Small Businesses)	Cloud accounting specialist for small business owners.	Web app
Gem Accounts	Software as a Service	Yes	Yes	Yes	Low to mid-market	General ledger, AR, AP, double-entry bookkeeping, payroll, multi-user, chart of accounts, small business accounting, mid-market enterprise accounting, multi-currency, multi-language, business reporting, management reporting, inventory control, service/project tracking & billing, open data and backup exports.	Web app
inDinero	Software as a Service	Yes	Yes	Yes	Small businesses, Startup company	Tax return, small business accounting, invoices, bookkeeping, invoices, bank integration, collaboration	Web app
Microsoft Dynamics AX	Proprietary	Yes	No	No	Midsize to high-end enterprises	E-commerce, ERP, CRM, BI, manufacturing, supply chain management (SCM), intercompany, multicurrency	Multi-user, multi-location, Terminal Server
Microsoft Dynamics GP	Proprietary	Yes	No	No	Small & mid-size enterprises (SME)	General ledger, AR, AP, double-entry bookkeeping, payroll, ERP, manufacturing, SCM, cost accounting, project accounting, analytic	Multi-user, web app, cloud computing, multi-location, Terminal Server, Remote Access, Mobile Access
Microsoft Dynamics 365 Business Central	Software as a Service	Yes	Yes	Yes	Small & Midsize Enterprises (SME)	General ledger, AR, AP, double-entry bookkeeping, payroll, ERP, CRM, manufacturing, SCM, intercompany, multicurrency, cost accounting, project accounting, reporting & analysis services	Web app
Microsoft Dynamics SL	Proprietary	Yes	No	No	Small & midsize enterprises (SME)	Project management, Project Accounting, Reporting & Analysis Services	Multi-user, multi-location, Terminal Server, Web Access
MYOB AccountRight	Proprietary	Yes	No	No	For small & midsize Businesses	AR, AP, double-entry accounting, payroll (Australia) Small Business Accounting, automatic bank feeds and downloads, online payments, standard business reporting, job management, time billing, management reporting, advanced inventory tracking and supplier management (multi-location in eligible plans), expense management, cost centre tracking, Multi-currency in eligible versions.	Web app, stand-alone
MYOB Business	Software as a Service	Yes	Yes	Yes	Small & Midsize Businesses	AR, AP, double-entry accounting, payroll (add-on), Small Business Accounting, automatic bank feeds and downloads, online payments, standard business reporting, management reporting, inventory tracking and supplier management, expense management	Web app
NetSuite	Software as a Service	Yes	Yes	Yes	Mid-market	E-commerce, ERP, CRM, SCM, inventory management, warehouse management system (WMS), accounting, Financial Management, Human Capital Management, Professional Services Automation, Ecommerce, Reporting, and Analytics	Web app
NewViews	Proprietary	Yes	No	No	Low to mid-market	General ledger, AR, AP, e-commerce, payroll (Canada and United States), multi-user, real-time, Integrated, Multi-Currency, Small Business Accounting, Inventory Control, Order Entry, Job Costing, Non-profit Housing Edition, Work Orders, Attachments (Scans)	Web app, cloud computing, stand-alone
NolaPro	Software as a Service and freeware	Yes	Yes	Yes	Low- to high-end market		
Open Systems Accounting Software	Proprietary	Yes	Yes	Yes	Low to mid-market	E-commerce, ERP, BI, SCM, reporting	Stand-alone
Oracle E-Business Suite	Proprietary	Yes	Yes	Yes	High-end market	ERP	Web app
Oracle Fusion Cloud ERP	Proprietary	Yes	Yes	Yes	High-end market	ERP, human resource management (HRM), SCM, financial management, Enterprise Performance Management	Web app
Oracle PeopleSoft Enterprise	Proprietary	Yes	Yes	Yes	High-end market	ERP, CRM, HRM, SCM, financial management, Enterprise Performance Management	Web app
Postbooks	Proprietary	Yes	Yes	Yes	Low to mid-market	Professional Services	Client–server
Passport Software	Proprietary	Yes	No	Yes	Mid- to low-end market	General ledger, AR, AP, ERP	Stand-alone
POS solutions	Proprietary	Yes	No	No	Newsagency pharmacy	POS	Stand-alone
QuickBooks Enterprise Solutions	Proprietary	Yes	Yes	No	Mid-market	Payroll, business management	Stand-alone
QuickBooks Online	Proprietary	Yes	Yes	Yes	Low-end market	AR, AP, double-entry accounting, payroll, small business accounting, Multi-currency in Global versions, automatic bank feeds and downloads, standard business reporting, management reporting, incorporated credit card and bank-to-bank Payments, inventory items, expense management	Web app
QuickBooks Pro/Premier	Proprietary	Yes	Yes	No	Low to mid-market	AR, AP, double-entry accounting, payroll, Small Business Accounting, Multi-currency in Global versions, automatic bank feeds and downloads, standard business reporting, management reporting, incorporated credit card and bank-to-bank Payments, inventory items, expense management, fixed asset depreciation	Stand-alone
Sage Group	Proprietary	Yes	No	No	Accounting Firms	Payroll, CRM	Stand-alone
Sage Accounting	Proprietary	Yes	Yes	Yes	Low-end market (for SME)	AR, AP, double-entry accounting, payroll, small business accounting, Multi-currency in Global versions, automatic bank feeds and downloads, standard business reporting, management reporting, incorporated credit card and bank-to-bank Payments, inventory items, expense management	Web app
Sage 50cloud	Proprietary	Yes	No	No	Low-end to High end	POS, payroll, CRM, BI, manufacturing, business management, Financials, Inventory, Job Costing, Procurement, HR; features and OS support dependent on country.	Stand-alone
Sage Intacct	Proprietary	Yes	Yes	Yes	Small & Midsize Enterprises (SME)	General ledger, AR, AP, inventory management, tax return, cash management, collaborate, contract and subscription billing, contract revenue management, fixed assets, multi-entity and global consolidations, order management, project accounting, purchasing, reporting and dashboards, spend management, time and expense management, vendor payment services	Web app
Sage 300 ERP	Proprietary	Yes	Yes	Yes	Mid-market	General ledger, AR, AP, ERP, inventory management, multicurrency, Intercompany, Reporting & Analysis services, Project & Job costing	Web app, stand-alone
Sage Enterprise Management	Proprietary	Yes	Yes	Yes	Mid-market	General ledger, AR, AP, ERP, inventory management, multicurrency, intercompany, Reporting & Analysis services, Project & Job costing	Web app, stand-alone
SAP Business ByDesign	Proprietary	Yes	Yes	Yes	Small & midsize enterprises (SME)	ERP, CRM, HRM, SCM, project management, financial management, Supplier Relationship Management, Enterprise Performance Management	Web app
SAP Business One	Proprietary	Yes	No	Yes (Server only)	Small & midsize enterprises (SME)	E-commerce, ERP	Stand-alone
SAP ERP	Proprietary	Yes	Yes	Yes	Midsize to High-end	E-commerce, ERP, CRM, BI, SCM, SRM, PLM, Global Trade Services (GTS), Mobile Business	Web app, stand-alone
Sybiz Vision	Proprietary and Software as a service	Yes	Yes	Yes	Low- to high-end market	Payroll, BI, manufacturing, inventory management, project management, accounting, job costing, multi-currency, traceability and auditing, budgeting, reporting and analytics	Multi-user, web app, cloud computing, stand-alone, multi-location, Terminal Server, Remote Access, Mobile Access
Tally.ERP 9	Proprietary and Software as a service	Yes	Yes	Yes	Low to high-end market	General ledger, AR, AP, POS, payroll, inventory management, accounting, billing, Stock/inventory, Purchase order, sales order, Bookkeeping, Financial Close Management, Balance Sheets, Business Reporting and analytics	Multi-user, stand-alone, multi-location, Web Access, Mobile Access
TRAVERSE	Proprietary	Yes	No	No	Low to mid-market	E-commerce, ERP, CRM, BI, manufacturing, SCM, distribution, intercompany, Multicurrency, Mobile Business Solutions, Reporting	Stand-alone
Wave Accounting	Proprietary	Yes	Yes	Yes	Entrepreneurs, freelancers, contractors, consultants, small businesses – Low-end market)	AR, AP, double-entry bookkeeping, payroll, Small Business Accounting, Multi-currency, automatic bank feeds, small business reporting	Web app
Xero	Software as a Service	Yes	Yes	Yes	Low to mid-market. Small & midsize enterprises (SME)	AR, AP, double-entry bookkeeping, payroll, small business accounting, Multi-currency, automatic bank feeds, standard business reporting, management reporting, fixed asset depreciation, inventory items, expenses management	Web app
ZipBooks	Proprietary	Yes	Yes	Yes	Low to mid-market	Invoicing, expense tracking, time tracking, credit card processing, bank integration	Web app
Package	License	Windows	macOS	Linux	Market focus	Type	Structure

Systems listed on a light purple background are no longer in active development.

== Further details ==
Package	Programming Language	First public release date (YYYY-MM-DD)	Latest stable release	Stable release date (YYYY-MM-DD)	Development Status	Database	Supported languages
Acumatica	C#, C++	2009-01-01	2022 R2	2022-09-15	5 - Production / Stable	SQL Server, MySQL	+100: UNICODE: English, Spanish, French, Chinese, Japanese, Malay, Khmer, Thai ...
Adempiere	J2EE, JBoss	2006-10-12	3.9.3	2019-12-02	5 - Production / Stable	Oracle Database, PostgreSQL	+10: English, Spanish, French, ...
Apache OFBiz	Java, XML, FreeMarker, Groovy, JavaScript	?	24.09.08	2026-10-12; 31 days ago	5 - Production / Stable	Oracle Database, PostgreSQL, Apache Derby, MSSQL, MySQL	Multilingual
Compiere	J2EE, JBoss	2001-06-08	3.8.9	2016-09-13	5 - Production / Stable	Oracle Database, PostgreSQL, Advance Server, MS SQL	+10: English, Germany, Spanish, French, Indonesia,...
GnuCash	C 80%, Scheme / Lisp 13%, Perl 7%?	1999-11-08 - Registered	5.17	2026-09-27; 46 days ago	5 - Production / Stable	PostgreSQL, MariaDB, MySQL	software: 33 languages; website: 8 languages
JFire	J2EE, JBoss, Eclipse RCP, JDO	?	1.0.1	2010-03-20	?	MS SQL, Derby, ...	English, German, Thai, ...
LedgerSMB	Perl	2006-09-06	1.13.7	2026-07-06	5 - Production / Stable	PostgreSQL	+40:English development, Multilingual (.po files Gettext#Translating )
NewViews	C++, Tcl/Tk	1985	2.38.10	2026-08-14	5 - Production / Stable	Proprietary, Object Oriented	English
Openbravo	J2EE, JBoss	2006	3.0.30460	2017-03-09	5 - Production / Stable	Oracle Database, PostgreSQL	English, German, Spanish (Spain), Spanish (Mexico), French, Italian, Dutch, Polish, Portuguese, Romanian, Russian, Chinese, Hebrew, Bulgarian, etc.
Odoo	Python, JavaScript	2005	20	2026-09; 2 months ago	5 - Production / Stable	PostgreSQL	+40 Multilingual
SQL-Ledger	Perl	1999-01-29	3.2.10	2021-06-22; 5 years ago	5 - Production / Stable	PostgreSQL	44
Tryton	Python	2008-11-17	7.0.34	2025-07-15; 15 months ago	5 - Production / Stable	PostgreSQL, SQLite	English, Bulgarian, Catalan, Czech, Dutch, French, German, Italian, Russian, Slovene, Spanish

== See also ==
- List of personal finance software
- List of ERP software packages
- Comparison of development estimation software
- List of project management software
