= FloQast =

American accounting software vendor

- Type: Private
- Industry: Software
- Founded: 2013; 13 years ago
- Founders: Mike Whitmire, CPA - CEO and Co-Founder; Chris Sluty, CPA - COO and Co-Founder; Cullen Zandstra - CTO and Co-Founder
- Headquarters: Los Angeles, California, U.S.
- Products: B2B Accounting Software
- Number of employees: 850 (2026)
- Website: floqast.com

FloQast is an American accounting software provider based in Los Angeles, California. Founded in 2013, the company provides close management software for corporate accounting departments.

== History ==
FloQast was founded by CPAs and former corporate accountants Mike Whitmire and Chris Sluty, along with veteran software engineer Cullen Zandstra. Whitmire first conceived the idea for the company during his time at Cornerstone OnDemand where he was a senior accountant.

After devising the concept, Whitmire recruited Zandstra as co-founder and CTO. The name FloQast was created with the help of a word generator using a combination of accounting terms and contemporary vernacular words. The two developed a minimum viable product (MVP), and were accepted into the Amplify.LA accelerator program. Following the company's initial funding, Whitmire recruited his former Syracuse University classmate, Sluty, to join the team as co-founder and COO.

In November 2014, the company raised a $1.3 million seed round of funding led by Amplify.LA and Toba Capital, before securing a $6.5 million Series A in early 2016.

In January 2017, the company received a G2 Crowd award for Best Software for Finance Teams. In February, it announced the opening of a second office in Columbus, Ohio.

In June 2017 the company raised a $25 million Series B funding led by Insight Partners.

That same year, the company received multiple Stevie Awards, including Gold for Company of the Year (Computer Software, up to 100 employees), and later moved to a new 20,000-square-foot office in Sherman Oaks.

In 2018 the company was recognized in CFO's Tech Companies to Watch 2018: Major Disruptors list.

In July 2021, FloQast raised a $110 million Series D round at a $1.2 billion valuation. The round was led by Meritech Capital with participation from Redpoint Ventures, Sapphire Ventures, Coupa Ventures, and continued participation from prior investors including Insight Partners, Polaris Partners, and Norwest Venture Partners.

On April 10, 2024, FloQast closed its Series E funding round, raising $100 million led by ICONIQ Growth, a tech-focused fund from ICONIQ Capital, with Roy Luo joining the board. New investors included BDT & MSD Partners and World Innovation Lab (WiL), alongside continued support from Meritech Capital and Sapphire Ventures.

== Product ==
FloQast is a Software as a Service (SaaS) accounting application that assists with close management. The product provides accounting teams with checklists and tie-outs linked to Excel workbooks and the client of organizations’ enterprise resources planning (ERP) system to automate reconciliations. In 2019, the company introduced FloQast AutoRec, a tool that relies on artificial intelligence to help automate the reconciliation process.

Its main competitors include accounting software companies BlackLine Systems, Numeric, and Workiva
