= MYOB (company) =

Australian accountancy company

MYOB limited
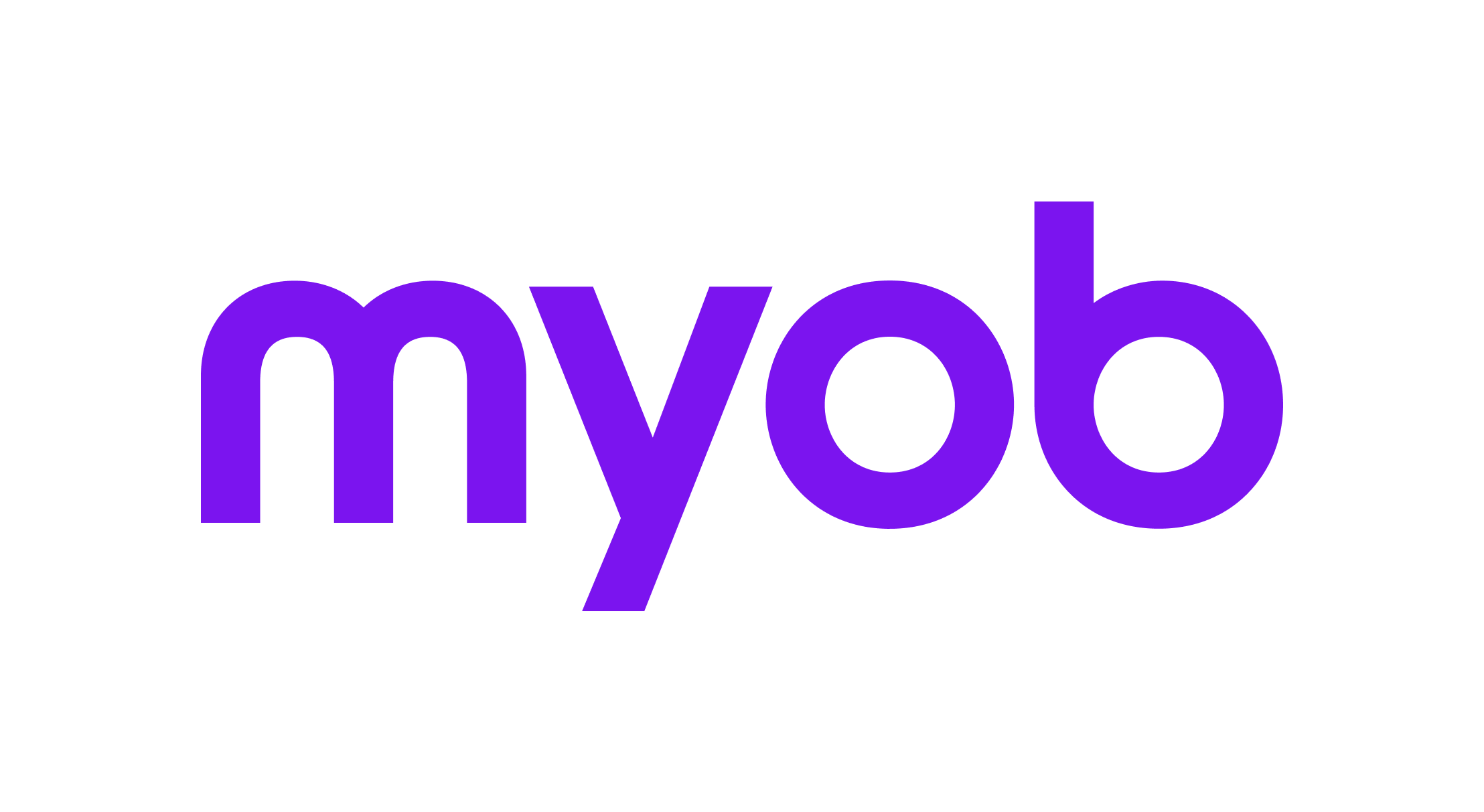
- Type: Private company
- Industry: Information technology
- Predecessor: Data-Tech Software
- Founded: 1991; 35 years ago
- Headquarters: Cremorne, Victoria
- Key people: Paul Robson (CEO)
- Products: Accounting software, ERP
- Parent: KKR
- Website: MYOB.com

MYOB (meaning mind your own business) is an Australian multinational corporation that provides tax, accounting and other business services software to small and medium businesses. It is owned by KKR.

== Products ==
MYOB has a suite of products spanning the small business accounting software market, the payroll and HRM market, the accountants vertical and mid-market enterprise resource planning (ERP) market. Whilst there are still some components of the product suites that are on-premise, the majority and all new products are cloud-based. Most products are sold via the subscription billing model (SaaS). The first edition of MYOB's small business browser-based software was released in August 2010 and was known as Live Accounts. On 24 October 2012, MYOB released AccountRight Live, an update to its flagship product – a Microsoft-Windows–only software suite which had online storage of data.

== Mergers and acquisitions ==
- Flare HR Pty Ltd 2022
- Tall Emu CRM 2022
- Nimbus 2022
- GreatSoft Australia 2021
- Butn Limited 2021
- Greentree on 1 August 2016
- Ace Payroll on 1 June 2015
- IMS Payroll in 2015
- PayGlobal in 2014
- BankLink 4 June 2013
- Acquired by Bain Capital in Sept 2011
- Smartyhost on 20 August 2008 – divested 5 August 2013
- ilisys on 28 February 2008 – divested 5 August 2013
- Exonet on 5 January 2007 - Tim Molloy, Bruce Carr and Sam Lewis-Roberts
- Comacc Limited on 1 August 2006
- Macquarie Outsource Pty Ltd and Macquarie Outsource Sdn Bhd on 30 March 2006
- Conto Ltd and JumpStart Computer Accounting and Trainers Ltd on 31 January 2006
- Solution 6 Holdings on 29 March 2004
- NZA Gold Limited on 5 March 2003
- Rorquals Business Solutions Limited on 23 November 2000
- SeaSoft Computer Services Sdn Bhd on 9 October 2000
- Professional Tools (NZ) Ltd on 30 November 1999
- Blue Tongue Technology Pty Ltd on 11 October 1999
- CA Systems on 27 September 1999

Acquisitions by Solution 6 before the merger with MYOB

- Xlon Pty Ltd and parent company Ceedata Holdings on 8 December 2000
- VIZTOPIA Software Limited and parent company MICL Holdings Limited on 19 September 2000

Acquisitions by Data-Tech Software Pty Ltd before changing the name to MYOB

- Teletax Systems Pty Ltd on 8 October 1997
- Bestware in 1996

== History ==
MYOB was founded in the early 1980s by a team of developers at Teleware, who developed accounting software. Teleware was purchased by Best Software (now part of Sage) in 1993. Data-Tech Software was the Australian republisher of the MYOB products and, in 1997 entered into an agreement with Best Software to buy the company (renamed MYOB Inc.) and bought the intellectual property rights to the software. In 1999, Data-Tech changed its name to MYOB Limited and listed on the Australian Securities Exchange (ASX). In subsequent corporate development, MYOB Limited merged with Solution 6 Holdings in 2004. Though the company was founded in the United States, it ceased operations outside of Australia and New Zealand in 2008.

Co-founder Brad Shofer left the company in 2003.

In December 2008, Acclivity announced it acquired MYOB US Inc. and its Macintosh (and PC) development team from MYOB Limited of Australia. Acclivity now drives global development of MYOB's Mac OS business management products – AccountEdge Basic, AccountEdge Pro and AccountEdge Pro Network Edition.

In January 2009, a private equity consortium led by Archer Capital completed a takeover bid for MYOB, returning MYOB to private ownership.

In August 2011, Archer Capital sold MYOB to Bain Capital for an undisclosed amount. The acquisition gave Bain Capital a majority stake in MYOB alongside management continued to be shareholders in the company.

MYOB Group Limited was readmitted to the official list of the Australian Securities Exchange in May 2015.

In November 2017, MYOB proposed to buy Reckon's accounting group for $180 million. However, failure to obtain regulatory permission caused the deal to fall apart in May 2018.

In April 2018, MYOB sold its rental payment system RentPay to Rent.com.au for $425,000. In May 2018, MYOB partnered with Network 10's Shark Tank.

MYOB Group Limited was delisted from the ASX in May 2019, after it sold to private equity firm KKR.

=== BankLink ===
BankLink was an accounting service for GST and end of year tax in Australia and New Zealand. BankLink started its business in 1986, and was acquired by MYOB in June 2013.

It was a privately owned business based in Auckland, New Zealand. BankLink launched in the United Kingdom in 2011. In 2012 BankLink partnered with MYOB so that BankLink provided data to be used in MYOB's accounting products.

== See also ==
- Comparison of accounting software
