= Gem Accounts =

Accounting software

Gem Software Solutions Pty Ltd
- Type: Private company
- Industry: Software
- Founded: 2012
- Defunct: October 2013
- Fate: Acquired
- Successor: Simpro
- Headquarters: Brisbane, Australia
- Area served: Australia, New Zealand, Canada, United Kingdom and United States
- Products: Software as a service accounting software
- Website: www.gemaccounts.com

Gem Accounts was an Australian accounting software business using a SaaS model to provide accounting software to small and medium business (SMB). The first version was released in 2013 by Gem Software Solutions, based in Brisbane. The company was acquired soon after its launch by SimPro Software in October 2013 and the product rebranded under the SimPro name.

Before its acquisition, Gem Accounts claimed its software offered several first in its space. Gems data export and backup facilities were one of the first cloud-based products - allowing the user to do a full export of their data set in several open formats. Gem Accounts was also the first cloud accounting company to join the "Free Our Data" initiative.

== History ==
The first version of the system was released for beta in January 2013, and was fully released in May 2013. A major upgrade and a free, SMB versions were released in November. The document storage was added in all plans in December.

The company was acquired in late 2013.

== Versions ==
Gem Accounts were available in three different versions. All versions contain the full feature set but were limited by transaction volume. Key Features included: General Ledger, Accounts Receivable, Accounts Payable, Double-entry System, Multi-user, Multi-currency, Multi-language, Inventory Control, Service and Project Tracking & Billing, Payroll, Data and Backup Exports.

Free version was designed for the micro and small business market. All the features of the main product but with a limit of 150 transactions and did not include access to the API, multi-company and consolidated reporting.

SME version was designed for the SME market and contained all the MME features but has a 1,500 transaction limit.

MME version was the full-featured product with no transaction or other limitations.

== See also ==
- Comparison of accounting software
