= Valiant Finance =

Australian financial services company

- Industry: Financial services
- Founded: 2015
- Founder: Alex Molloy, Ritchie Cotton
- Headquarters: Surry Hills, Sydney, Australia
- Products: Business loans
- Website: Valiant Finance

Valiant Finance is an Australian business finance marketplace founded in 2015 and headquartered in Sydney.

== History ==
Valiant was founded in 2015 by Alex Molloy and Ritchie Cotton.

== Funding and partnerships ==
Since its founding, Valiant has raised approximately AU $40 million in funding. Investors include Reinventure Group, which contributed around AU $5 million across seed to Series B rounds, as well as 1835i and Salesforce Ventures. Reinventure and 1835i are the venture capital arms of Westpac and ANZ, respectively.

The company has formed partnerships with large organisations. These include Australia Post, to provide finance access across its locations and websites; MYOB, integrating Valiant's lending services into its accounting platform; and Qantas Business Rewards, as part of its financial services offering.
