= Simpro =

SaaS company

The Simpro Group Pty Ltd
- Type: Private
- Industry: Software as a Service (SaaS)
- Founded: 2002 in Brisbane, Queensland, Australia
- Founders: Stephen Bradshaw, Vaughan McKillop
- Headquarters: Brisbane, Australia
- Area served: Australia, New Zealand, United States and United Kingdom
- Key people: Fred Voccola (CEO)
- Products: Global field management software including add-ons
- Website: www.simprogroup.com

Simpro is a global SaaS company that provides cloud-based job and project management software to those in field service and trade contracting industries. The company was founded 2002 and has offices in Australia, New Zealand, the United Kingdom and the United States.

== History ==
Simpro was founded in 2002, after electrical business owner Steve Bradshaw approached software engineering student Vaughan McKillop about creating a website for his electrical contracting business.

The origin of the name Simpro comes from an abbreviation of Service Industry Management PROfessional.

In October 2013 the company acquired Gem Software Solutions with its Gem Accounts SaaS based accounting software which were rebranded and integrated into the company's product set.

On the 24th November 2021, the company acquired AroFlo and ClockShark, after a US$350 million funding round.

On the 25th October 2024, the company acquired BigChange, the company founded by serial entrepreneur Martin Port.
