= POS Solutions =

Australian software company

POS Solutions Limited
- Company type: Private
- Industry: Computer software
- Founded: Australia (1983)
- Headquarters: Keysborough, Victoria, Australia
- Products: Accounting & Business Software & Services
- Number of employees: 50 (2007)
- Website: www.possolutions.com.au

POS Solutions, is an Australian company that provides software and services to small and medium businesses, where the company has enjoyed steady growth so making it particularly well known in Australia Newsagencies where its software has taken hold as the market leader.

Its product and services range from entry software to multi user enterprise software for retail point of sale software or retail POS.

== See also ==
- Comparison of accounting software
- Point of Sale Malware
