= NolaPro =

Accounting software application

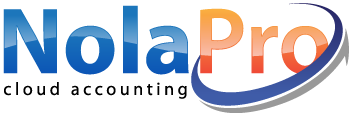

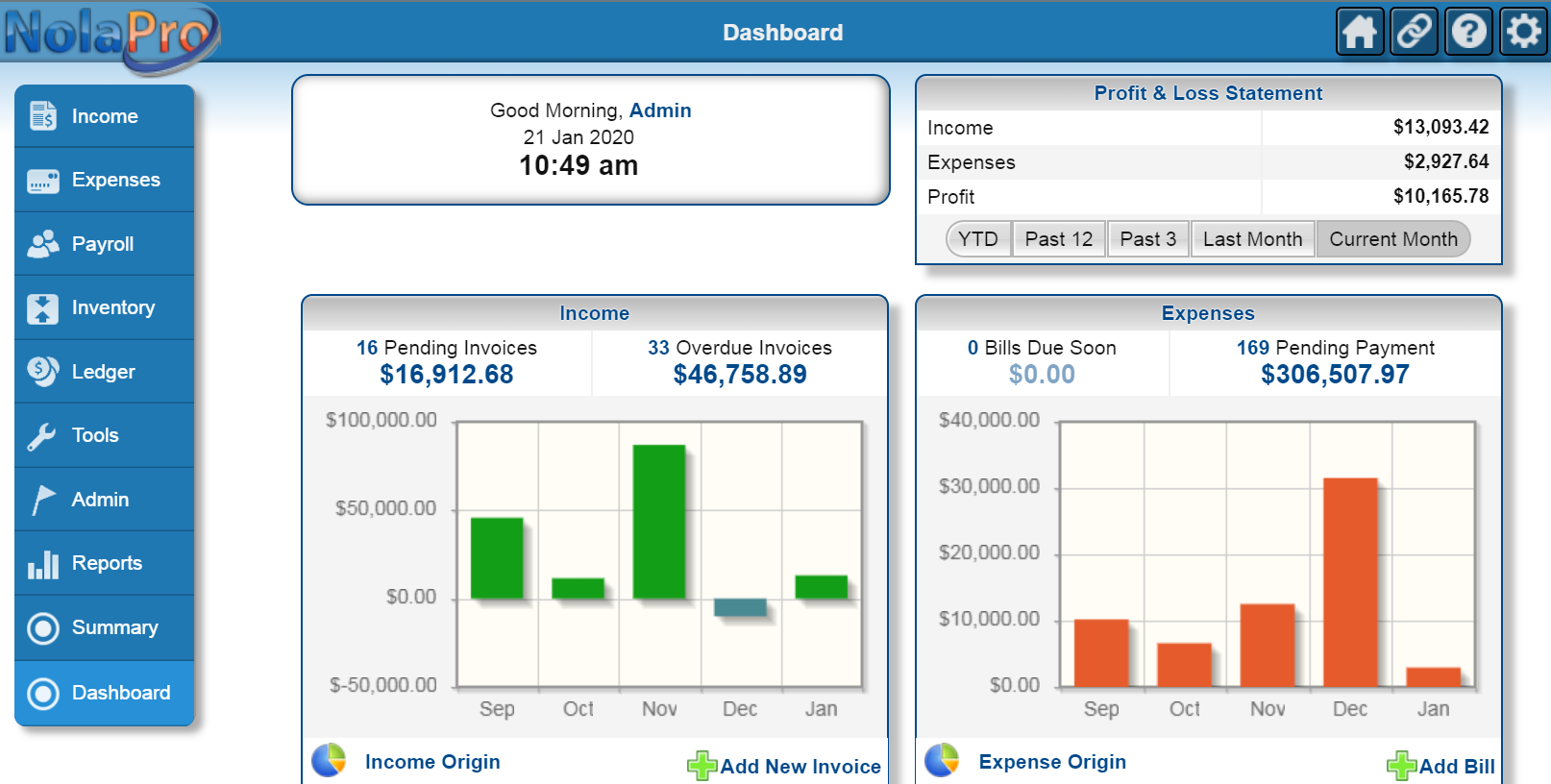
- Developer: Noguska Inc
- Stable release: 5.0.25838 / August 19, 2026
- Operating system: Cross-platform
- Type: Accounting
- License: Freeware
- Website: www.nolapro.com

NolaPro is a cloud/web-based ERP application running under a proprietary commercial license. It was first released in 2003 as a freeware accounting alternative to SAP ERP and QuickBooks because of its ability to scale in these markets.

== Functionality ==
NolaPro allows custom functionality changes upon request. It permits unrestricted integration with 3rd party applications and offers source code procurement for companies to develop their own ERP systems.

This application can be installed via desktop download, or cloud-hosted by the author or installed locally on Microsoft Windows or Linux, accessed via common web browsers, and utilizes MySQL and PHP.

Multi-currency is available for NolaPro, making it one of the few small applications which supports monetary exchange rates. It has been translated into 30+ languages via contributions from the NolaPro community. An API is also available for developers who wish to integrate NolaPro with their in-house or 3rd party applications. From 2013 to 2016, NolaPro was featured on all Lenovo devices under the Windows 8 store platform.

== Reviews ==
In May 2005, NolaPro was recognized by Entrepreneur Magazine by its inclusion in Entrepreneur's 2005 Complete Guide to Software.

NolaPro was featured on the cover of the Linux Journal in November 2008.

In November 2019, The Balance (formerly About.com) ranked NolaPro as the #1 option for Small Business Accounting software.

== See also ==
- Accounting software
- Comparison of accounting software
