= AME =

Ame, AME, or AmE may refer to:

== Companies and organizations ==
- African Methodist Episcopal Church
- African Methodist Episcopal Zion Church
- AME Accounting Software
- Ame (restaurant), in San Francisco, California
- American Modern Ensemble, a music ensemble based New York City
- Ametek, American technology company
- Atelier Mécanique de Mulhouse, a French armament research and development facility in charge of light weapons design after World War II
- Club América, a professional football club based in Mexico City, Mexico

== Occupations ==
- Aircraft Maintenance Engineer
- Aircraft maintenance engineer (Canada)
- Aviation medical examiner

== People ==
- Saint Amé (died 630), Benedictine abbot and hermit who is also called Saint Amatus
- Saint Aimé (died 690), abbot of the Agaune monastery in Switzerland and bishop of the Sens (or Sion) diocese
- A*M*E (born 1994), singer-songwriter from Sierra Leone
- Ame (gamer) (born 1997), professional Chinese Dota 2 player
- Âme, house/techno duo consisting of Kristian Beyer and Frank Wiedemann
- Watson Amelia, virtual YouTuber

== Other uses ==
- Absolutely maximally entangled state, in quantum information science
- Adobe Media Encoder, a transcoder that is part of Adobe Creative Cloud
- âme, the sound post of a member of the viol or violin family
- American English
- AME VI, a type of reconnaissance plane built in Spain in 1924
- Amplitude modulation equivalent
- Apparent mineralocorticoid excess syndrome
- Saint-Amé, a commune in the Vosges department in Lorraine in north-eastern France
