= NewViews =

Accounting software

NewViews Accounting Software
- Developer: Q.W.Page Associates Inc.
- Stable release: 2.38.10 (current release) / August 14, 2026
- Operating system: Microsoft Windows
- Type: Accounting software
- License: Proprietary
- Website: https://newviews.com

NewViews is accounting software that is developed and distributed by Q.W.Page Associates Inc., a privately held company based in Aurora, Ontario, Canada. NewViews is noted for its integrated, non-modular approach, which enables the total financial cycle to be updated instantly as each transaction is added. It also allows users to customize nearly every aspect of a set of books. This flexibility comes with a trade-off, however, as NewViews is perceived to have a long learning curve, and to require an investment of time and effort to create a customized accounting solution. In a software review published in InfoWorld, NewViews was compared to "going to a tailor and handing him a bolt of cloth and a pair of scissors."

== History ==
NewViews was first launched in Canada in September 1985 at the Toronto International Software Show. In November 1986, shortly after its U.S. launch, NewViews was awarded PC Magazine’s Award for Technical Excellence at Comdex in Las Vegas.

NewViews was considered a radical departure from other accounting software programs. It was described by some as revolutionary, by others as making the dry business of accounting exciting and fun. It dispensed with separate modules (e.g. accounts payable, accounts receivable, payroll, etc.) and organized accounting documents into an integrated hierarchical structure that was updated in real-time. It also allowed users to view and edit accounting documents in much the same way they could view and edit data on a spreadsheet.

After a lengthy delay, the multi-user version of NewViews (NV2) was released for Microsoft Windows in 2005.

A custom standalone Nonprofit Housing / Subsidized Housing edition was released in 2014. This custom version has additional features specific to Housing such as automatic Rent-Geared-to-Income (RGI) calculations, Work Order management, Personalized Forms and Notices, etc.

== Features ==
=== General structure and approach ===
The current NewViews interface is modeled on File Explorer. Accounting data in a set of books is organized in a tree or hierarchical structure called the NewViews Database Explorer. The Database Explorer is used to navigate between four main levels of detail: reports, accounts, transactions and distributions.

NewViews does not rely on accounting modules, as is typical of other accounting software programs. Instead, reporting structure is controlled by the way accounts are totaled on reports (referred to as report arithmetic). An account can total to another account on the same report, or to an account on any other report. The ability to total an account on one report to an account on another report is the foundation of integration in NewViews. For example, the change to retained earnings on the income statement can be totaled to the retained earnings on the balance sheet to reflect this relationship. Total amounts from subsidiary ledgers and schedules can also be totaled directly to controlling accounts on financial statements or other subsidiary reports. In this way, NewViews can be set up to accommodate standard subsidiary ledgers (e.g. accounts payable, accounts receivable, inventory, etc.) as well as highly customized reports that are specific to user needs (e.g. reports required for fund accounting in not-for-profit agencies).

Transactions can be added through journals, or directly to account ledgers. When transactions are added directly to the account ledger, corresponding journal entry is created automatically. Account totals are updated instantaneously as each transaction is entered, modified or deleted. As each account total is updated, the change ripples forward through the report arithmetic. In this way, the entire set of books is updated in real-time. Historical data for all accounts are retained indefinitely, and can be viewed on a yearly, monthly, quarterly, biweekly, weekly or daily basis.

All changes to a set of books are recorded in an audit trail that is stored within the database; it can be viewed by users with access rights but cannot be modified.

=== Year end ===
NewViews tracks transaction activity for each account in real-time. An account's ledger balance can be set as perpetual, periodic or opening in order to retain its history and the books are never closed. Users can set a global edit date range as part of their local account profile to prevent changes to prior fiscal periods. Users can set specific date ranges on the History View of reports in order to obtain snapshots of the accounting activity for any given period.

=== Payroll ===
The ability to process Canadian and United States payroll is fully integrated into NewViews, and both can be used in the same set of books at the same time. NewViews payroll supports an unlimited number of employees, and unlimited earnings and deduction categories. Payroll transactions (paychecks/time-cards) and item details of each transaction are treated as standard debits and credits. Direct deposit and electronic filing have been available since the release of version 2.06 in December 2005.

=== Multi-user ===
Multi-user communication is through TCP/IP, therefore no proprietary server hardware or software is required. Any computer can function as a NewViews server or workstation as long as it has access to a local area network and/or the internet. The main database file (set of books) can be located on any computer, local, wide area or cloud. A server is simply the NewViews program configured to run as a server and offer access to one or more sets of books. Both workstation and server functionality are included with each NewViews license. Any number of users can work in the same set of books simultaneously; accounts and reports are updated in real-time, even when the books are being accessed remotely.

== See also ==
- Comparison of accounting software
