= PBSC =

PBSC may refer to:

== Acronym ==
- PBSC Urban Solutions, a bike share corporation
- Palm Beach State College
- Peripheral blood stem cells
- Politburo Standing Committee
- Polar Bear Software Corporation
- Prayer Book Society of Canada, an Anglican interest group
