= Coda plc =

Software company in United Kingdom

CODA plc
- Type: Public limited company
- Industry: Software
- Founded: 1979; 47 years ago in Leeds
- Founder: Rodney Potts and Christopher Lennox
- Headquarters: Chippenham, UK
- Products: Business software
- Revenue: £41.72 million GBP (2009)
- Operating income: £9.56 million GBP (2006)
- Net income: £7.59 million GBP (2006)
- Number of employees: ~600
- Parent: Unit 4 Agresso
- Website: www.coda.com

CODA plc was a mid-sized international financial software company based in the United Kingdom. Founded in 1979, it was purchased in 2008 by Unit4, a supplier of enterprise software, based in the Netherlands.

== History ==
CODA was founded in Leeds, Yorkshire in 1979 by Rodney Potts and Christopher Lennox and in the early 1990s the company's head office was moved to Harrogate. At this point CODA had around 600 employees working from 14 country operations around the world.

In 1994 CODA group PLC was bought by Dutch software company Baan Corporation for £52.9 million ($86.7 million), which wanted to compete in the market for standalone financial software and enhance the existing finance offering.

In 2000, Baan got into financial difficulties and the CODA line of business was acquired by one of its main implementation partners, Science Systems in the UK (today SCISYS). The Chippenham-headquartered software and consulting company acquired the trade and assets of CODA in 2000, renaming its holding company CODA SciSys PLC in 2002.

In 2006, CODA SciSys announced a demerger to form two listed companies, CODA (the financial software company) and SciSys (a space and public sector IT company).

In 2008, CODA was acquired by Unit4 Agresso.

== See also ==
- Comparison of accounting software
