= Passport Software =

American accounting software company

Passport Software, Inc.
- Industry: Computer software
- Founded: 1983
- Headquarters: Northfield, Illinois
- Key people: John Miller, President; Muriel Miller, VP Sales
- Website: www.pass-port.com

Passport Software, Inc. is a privately held company located in Northfield, Illinois that manufactures and markets accounting software, manufacturing software, and business software to small to mid-sized companies under the brand name Passport Business Solutions.

Passport Software, Inc. released their latest version of software in 2020 with annual updates. Passport Business Solutions is available in Windows, UNIX and Linux versions. PBS is the next generation of RealWorld software.

== History ==
Passport Software, Inc. was founded in 1983 by John Miller, Bob Wall, and Muriel Spencer. As a distributor of RealWorld Accounting Software in the 1980s, Passport developed specialized Unix accounting software. In February, 2000, Great Plains Software purchased RealWorld Corporation. Microsoft purchased Great Plains one year later.

Since 2000, Passport Software, Inc. has continued the enhancement and development of RealWorld software, now called Passport Business Solutions. The company maintains a partner channel of hundreds of partners who sell its products throughout North America and the Caribbean.

=== Litigation ===
Passport was a long-time licensed dealer of RealWorld through its purchase by Great Plains software and beyond. In 1989, Passport licensed its PBS derivative of RealWorld for five years to Do It Best Corporation, known as DIB. In October and November of 2000, after unsuccessful negotiations to renew and expand the license, DIB started negotiating a license from Great Plains, the new owner of RealWorld, and worked with Passport to remove Passport's updates to RealWorld. Passport discovered that DIB had long been using a purchase order program that it claimed to have developed on its own, but which had been mostly copied from an unlicensed Passport purchase order software modules, and showing a DIB copyright. Around this time, Passport copyright notices in DIB's software were replaced with a DIB division name's copyright notice.

In May 2001, Great Plains decided to terminate Passport's license to RealWorld, which at that time was set to run through 2010. DIB sued Passport preemptively to prevent Passport form interfering with its use of the software, and Passport countersued for copyright infringement for the purchase order system, and for instigating Great Plains to terminate the RealWorld license to Passport.

== Manufacturing ==
Part of Passport Software, Inc. comprises a manufacturing software division called PBS Manufacturing. The software originated in 1983 as SBS, a COBOL based system designed by Schuleter Business Systems, Inc. and later became SBS 2000 under the ownership of Superior Business Solutions, Inc. In 2005 Passport Software, Inc. acquired Superior Business Solutions, Inc. and SBS 2000.

PBS Manufacturing is used in automation of manufacturing operations such as shop floor scheduling, material requirements planning, inventory control, and manpower planning.

== See also ==
- Comparison of accounting software
