= Sage Business Cloud =

Suite of accounting software products

- Developer: Sage Group
- Release: 2011; 15 years ago
- Written in: Ruby on Rails.NET Core; C#
- Type: Accounting software
- License: Proprietary
- Website: www.sage.com

Sage Accounting and Sage Payroll are a suite of cloud-based accountancy and payroll products developed by Sage Group aimed at small and medium-sized enterprises as well as the self-employed. They exist under the suite banner of Sage Business Cloud, and the products were initially known as Sage One and are available in many of the territories that Sage operate.

Originally launched in the UK and Ireland in 2011 Sage Business Cloud is a set of small business management tool that offers accounting, payroll, payments and time-tracking tools. It includes mobile apps that accept business payments, manage and pay bills, and payroll functions. The product launched in the United States in 2012, Canada, France, Germany and Spain in 2013 and has since launched in other territories that Sage operates in.

In 2025, Sage Business Cloud Payroll was recognised as one of the UK's best small business payroll software options by BusinessPrices.co.uk, due to it being a "robust payroll solution" with a "long-standing reputation in the market".

Sage Business Cloud is developed using Ruby on Rails and C#/.NET Core by global teams within Sage including at those at their headquarters in Newcastle upon Tyne, England.

The Sage Business Cloud brand is applied to Sage's cloud-based offerings, including Sage People and Sage HR. Sage X3, is also a part of the wider Sage Business Cloud brand but aimed at larger enterprises. Additionally, Sage X3 is part of the Sage Business Cloud portfolio but is specifically designed for larger enterprises, providing advanced enterprise resource planning (ERP) capabilities that support complex business processes like finance, supply chain management, and production.

== See also ==
- Comparison of accounting software
