= Martin Port =

English entrepreneur (born 1962)

- Born: Martin Harry Port; 29 July 1962 (age 63); Leeds, England
- Occupation: Founder and Chairman of BigChange
- Years active: 1989–present
- Spouse: Amanda Port
- Children: 4
- Website: martinport.com

Martin Harry Port (born 29 July 1962) is an English entrepreneur, based in West Yorkshire, North of England. He is the founder and former managing director of Masternaut UK Ltd - the UK expansion of French firm, Masternaut International, a telematics company specialising in fleet management and vehicle tracking services. Port was also the majority shareholder in Masternaut UK Ltd until he sold the business to Hub Telecom, a subsidiary of Europe's second largest Airport group, Aeroports De Paris (ADP) in 2009. At the time of the sale to ADP, the UK company had an enterprise value of £20m. In 2019, Masternaut was acquired by Michelin, the French tyre manufacturer.

In 2012, Port founded the Leeds-based software company BigChange to focus on developing technology solutions that improve how businesses manage and monitor their mobile workforces. In 2021, Boston-based Great Hill Partners invested £75m of growth capital in BigChange, valuing the company at £100m.

On the 25th October 2024, the Simpro Group acquired BigChange. Port left his role as Chairman, however remains a shareholder.

== Early life ==
Martin Port was born into an Anglo-Jewish family in Leeds, West Yorkshire, North of England. He attended Moortown County Primary School and later attended Allerton Grange High School. At the age of 14, Martin had a Saturday job at Cecil Gee department store in their menswear department. At the age of 15, Martin started a small printing business with his friend, producing business cards for local companies around Leeds. In 1986, 24-year-old Martin Port moved to New York City in the United States to help a friend who had founded a German bakery business. Martin returned to the UK three years later and started his first business called Kroustie. Kroustie sold bread to retailers and wholesalers. This was founded with the support of a government enterprise allowance. After failing to achieve runaway success with Kroustie, Martin moved into technology. Martin's entrepreneurial success has been achieved despite dyslexia and hearing loss.

== Career and achievements ==
Martin founded the Masternaut UK business with hardware bought from French firm, Masternaut France, and began developing software from an operational centre in Leeds, UK. Masternaut UK was one of the first UK companies to offer software-as-a-service, with its web-based vehicle tracking solutions.

As the UK Managing Director, Martin took Masternaut UK from a small startup in 2002 to become one of the UK's fastest growing businesses, with places in The Sunday Times Tech Track 100 in 2007, 2008 and 2009. Martin's entrepreneurial endeavours were recognised in 2008 when he won the prestigious Ernst and Young Entrepreneur of the Year Award for Technology and Communications, and in 2010, with an IoD Director of the Year Award as a Runner up "Highly Commended" in the Small and Medium Size Enterprise category. His company also attained a 2009 place in the Deloitte Technology Fast 500 EMEA. Martin Port also made headlines in 2009 having been chosen as one of Dell's 'Heroes' on their Take Your Own Path (TYOP) global campaign, which shun the light on extraordinary entrepreneurs.

Martin founded BigChange to help business owners get rid of paperwork and inefficiencies. He served as CEO until 2021, when he moved into a chairman role. He remains a significant shareholder in the business.

Since selling a majority stake in BigChange in 2021, Martin Port has invested in a number of companies as an angel investor. These include online tradesperson marketplace Rated People and data analytics provider Panintelligence.

In 2020, BigChange was recognised for innovation in the Queen's Awards for Enterprise, the UK's highest official awards for British businesses. The company also won the Yorkshire Post's Best Company 2021 in the £10m to £50m category. In the GP Bullhound Northern Tech Awards 2021, BigChange was recognised as one of the Top 15 Fastest Growing Larger Technology Companies in the North of England Scotland and Ireland. It was also named in the Deloitte Technology Fast 50 in 2017 and 2018, and featured in the Sunday Times Tech Track 100 for three years in a row.

BigChange was ranked 12th in the MegaByte 2020 Top 50 in UK Technology. Martin was selected by private equity house LDC and the Telegraph as one of Britain's 50 Most Ambitions Leaders. In 2020, BigChange's workplace was ranked among the UK's top employers, receiving two stars in the Sunday Times "Best Companies To Work For".

Martin is a longstanding ambassador for Transaid, the transport charity, and a member of Business in The Community, which aims to support local enterprises in Leeds.
