= Jess Mah =

American businesswoman

Jessica Mah
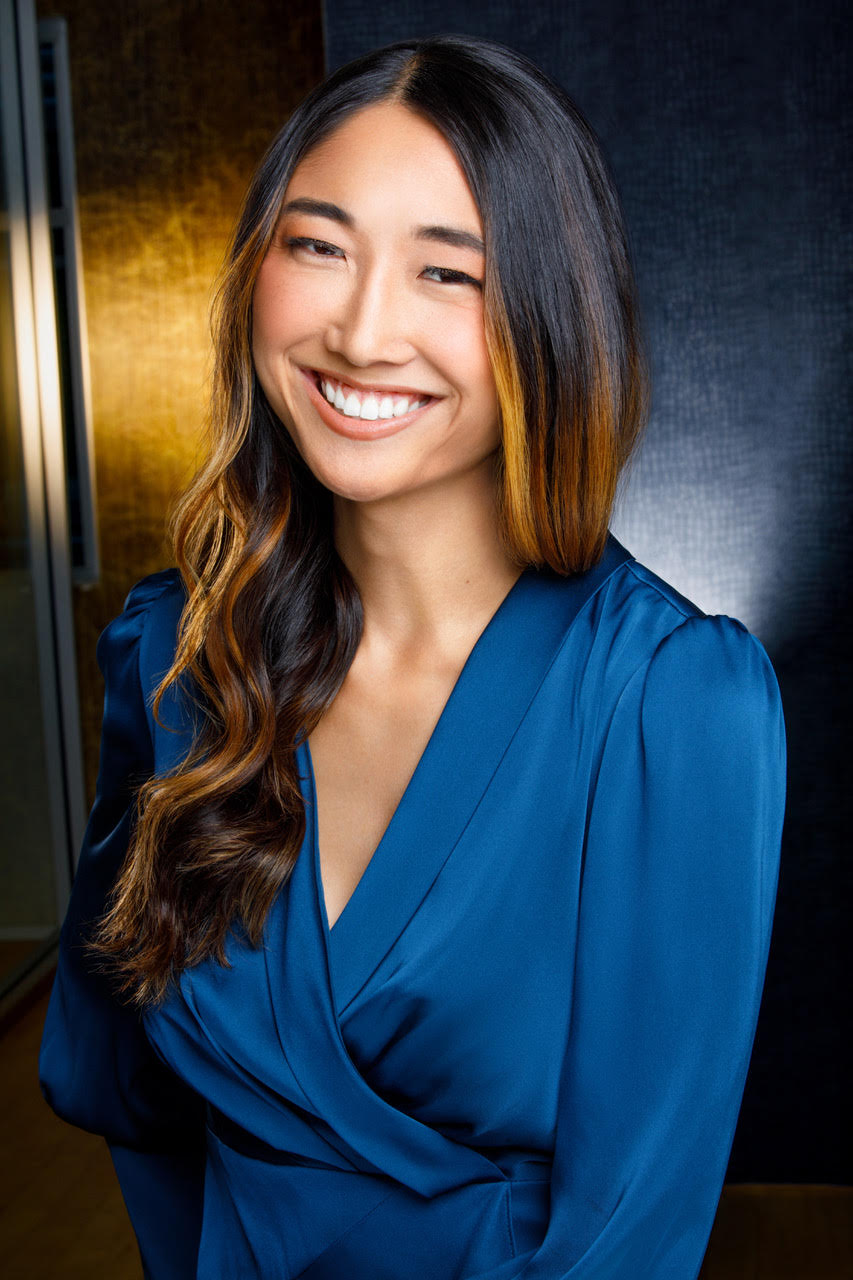
- Born: May 18, 1990 (age 36)
- Education: University of California, Berkeley, Bard College at Simon's Rock
- Occupation: Businesswoman

Jessica Mah (born May 18, 1990, in Westchester County, New York) is an American entrepreneur. Mah has founded several companies including InDinero and Mahway.

== Early life and education ==
Mah was born in 1990 in Westchester County, New York, her parents were entrepreneurs in the clothing business and immigrants from Hong Kong who relocated to the United States. Mah finished high school at the age of 15, and then she joined Bard College at Simon's Rock. At the age of 17, Mah joined the University of California, Berkeley's computer science program and graduated by the age of 19.

== Career ==
Mah began her first business when she was 11 by purchasing server space in bulk and selling fractions of the space for cheaper prices. At the age of 13, she started her first internet company selling computer parts on eBay.

In 2009, while at the University of California, Berkeley, Mah and her classmate Andy Su co-founded inDinero, a FinTech company providing accounting and financial software to businesses, and launched the firm's online dashboard a month after graduating from their computer science program.

Following Mah's graduation, she and Su applied to Y Combinator's summer program, and after presenting their idea formally to investors, they had 20 investors signed on. By 2014, inDinero raised $8 million from angel investors, and has raised more than $10 million by 2023.

Mah has received recognition such as being named to Forbes 30 Under 30 under the enterprise technology category, the Inc. Magazine 30 Under 30 list in 2012, and appeared on the August cover of Inc. Magazine in 2015.

As of 2023, Mah has founded three start-ups, including internshipIN an enterprise software as a service (SaaS) company and Mahway, a venture builder with a portfolio of five companies that has attracted capital from Silicon Valley investors.
