= Traverse (software) =

Business accounting software suite

TRAVERSE
- Developer: Open Systems Accounting Software
- Stable release: 11; November 11, 2009
- Operating system: Windows XP or later
- Type: Accounting Software
- Website: www.osas.com/traverse

TRAVERSE Accounting and Business Software (enterprise resource planning - ERP) is a business accounting software suite for small- to medium-sized businesses using the Microsoft Windows operating system. First produced in 1994 by Open Systems, Inc., TRAVERSE is a group of interrelated applications which operate in tandem. TRAVERSE runs using the Microsoft SQL Server database. In versions released from 1994 to 2009, TRAVERSE was coded with Visual Basic for Applications, and operated as a Microsoft Access application. The current version is coded using the C# programming language within the Microsoft .NET Framework, and no longer requires Microsoft Access.
