= Sage X3 =

Enterprise resource planning product

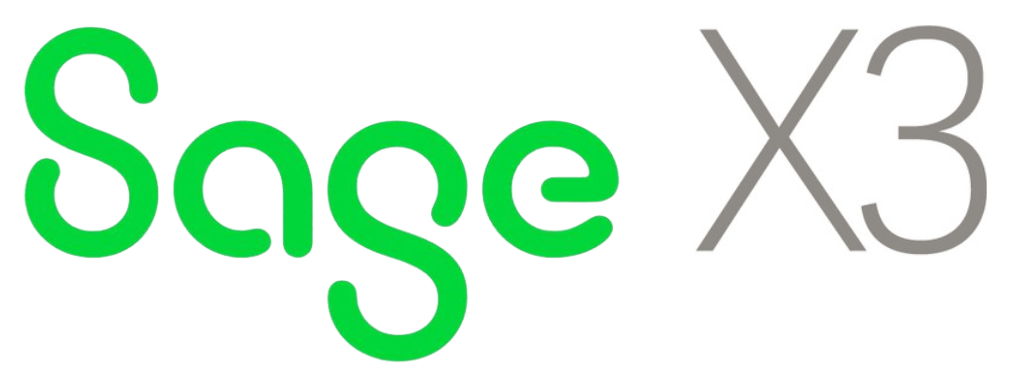
- Developer: Sage Group
- Initial release: 2000; 26 years ago
- Stable release: 12
- Type: ERP software
- License: Proprietary
- Website: www.sage.com

Sage X3 is an enterprise resource planning product developed by Sage Group aimed at established businesses. The product was formerly known as Sage ERP X3 and is available in many of the territories that Sage operate.

The product line which evolved into Sage X3, Adonix X3, was purchased by Sage in 2005. It was renamed Sage ERP X3 and later simply Sage X3. It briefly gained a longer name between 2017 and 2019, Sage Business Cloud Enterprise Management, as part of Sage's Sage Business Cloud offering, before returning to its previous Sage X3 name. Nucleus Research named the product a leader in ERP.

Sage Business Cloud Accounting and Payroll, formerly Sage One, is also a part of the wider Sage Business Cloud brand but aimed at smaller enterprises.

== Adonix history ==
In 1979 a French company called Société Parisienne de Micro-Informatique (SPEMI) was founded and they produced accounting software for Sord computers. The software was redeveloped for use on UNIX systems and a custom development tool was developed called Accès aux DONnées sous unIX (ADONIX). Adonix Entreprise V2 was written on that platform.

Adonix acquired Prodstar and the feature sets of Adonix V2 and Prodstar 2 were merged; this product was named Adonix X3. The first version of the current X3 product was released in 2000. Adonix acquired other firms including Italian ERP vendor Gruppo Formula SPA, the North American GSI Transcomm (formerly known as ADP-GSI Logistics and Distribution) in February 1999 and CIMPRO in December 2002 from MAI Systems leading to an expansion of offices into America. Sage acquired Adonix in November 2005 and continued development of the product adding many features including cloud functionality. Initially Sage X3 had been managed by Sage France, in 2009 Sage UK took responsibility for Sage X3, bringing the solution to the front of the Sage growth strategy.

== See also ==
- Comparison of accounting software
