= Aplos Software =

Aplos Software is a privately held company that specializes in software as a service for nonprofit organizations. Their primary focus is software to manage the nonprofit tasks of fund accounting, nonprofit tax preparation, and donor management for small, mid-sized, and large non-profit organizations.

== History ==
Aplos Software was founded in 2009 in Fresno, California by Dan Kelly and Tim Goetz, a certified public accountant. Tim Goetz previously served as an executive pastor of a church and helped found two nonprofits. He couldn't find the low-cost fund accounting solution he wanted for his nonprofits, so he joined with a Fresno-based investor that shared his vision to serve the nonprofit sector with simple, affordable software and founded Aplos Software.

- After initially developing a desktop fund accounting software program, in 2011 Aplos Software launched its fund accounting software, Aplos Accounting, as an online product, also known as software as a service, tailored specifically to small and mid-sized non-profit organizations and religious corporations.
- The company raised over $3.4 million in funding through an angel investor to expand the development of its web-based nonprofit software suite, $2 million of which was raised in 2014.
- Aplos launched an integration with Church Community Builder, a church management platform in January 2016.
- In February 2016, Aplos raised $4 million in additional funding through a private venture capital fund.
- In June 2017, Aplos announced a merger with Portalbuzz, a membership management platform that specializes in software and website portals for service clubs.
- Aplos and Gusto (software), a payroll and HR platform, launched an integrated solution for payroll and reimbursements to be tracked within the accounting of nonprofits and churches.

== Key Areas of Development ==
In October 2012, Aplos Software launched Aplos Oversight, an online software which provides an administrator or accountant real-time access to the accounting of multiple organizations.

=== Form 990 Preparation ===
In summer of 2012, Aplos Software was approved as an IRS efile provider to submit IRS tax forms on behalf of tax-exempt organizations and in October 2012 launched Aplos e-File, a tax preparation and filing software for IRS Form 990-N. IRS Form 990-N is an annual electronic IRS filing for tax-exempt organizations with less than $50,000 in annual gross receipts.

=== Donor Management ===
Aplos Software launched a contributions management module in 2012 that tracked donations within Aplos Accounting and created contribution statements, which are annual giving receipts required by the IRS. In July 2013 it began offering a donor management module, and in May 2017 it expanded on its module to launch a stand-alone product as Aplos Donor Management.

== See also ==
- Comparison of accounting software
- Fund accounting
- Non-profit organization
- Alternative giving
- Software as a service
- IRS Form 990
