= Ledger (software) =

Double-entry accounting app

- Original author: John Wiegley
- Release: 2003; 23 years ago
- Stable release: 3.4.1 / 26 October 2025; 9 months ago
- Operating system: Any Unix-like including macOS, Microsoft Windows
- Platform: Cross-platform
- Available in: C++
- Type: Double-entry bookkeeping system
- License: BSD-3-Clause
- Website: ledger-cli.org
- Repository: github.com/ledger/ledger

Ledger is a command-line based double-entry bookkeeping application. Accounting data is stored in a plain text file, using a simple format, which the users prepare themselves using other tools. Ledger does not write or modify data, it only parses the input data and produces reports.

== Reviews ==
Linux Weekly News editor Jonathan Corbet found Ledger to be a "powerful tool", particularly for generating reports, but that the software lacked many of the features necessary to scale to the needs of a small business. Joe Barr, writing for Linux.com, commented: "If you're an MBA who groks Emacs and regular expressions, or a kernel hacker who appreciates tax deferred accruals, you'll love this application."

FLOSS Weekly interviewed John Wiegley in 2011. It noted reading of GnuCash files, scriptability, an Emacs interface, and automated transactions as strong features, as well as the Common Lisp port and the Haskell port of the system.

== Ports ==
The Ledger system and file format have been quite influential, reimplemented in several other languages and inspiring similar tools. Actively developed ports include Abandon in Scala, Beancount in Python, and hledger in Haskell. Actively developed projects inspired by ledger include penny.

== See also ==
- Comparison of accounting software
