= SQL-Ledger =

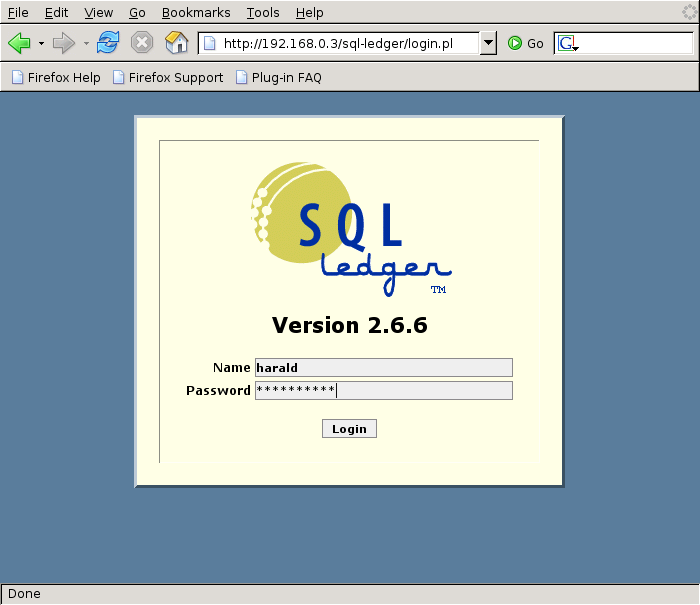
- SQL Ledger login screen
- Developer: DWS Systems Inc.
- Stable release: 3.2.10 / 22 June 2021; 5 years ago
- Operating system: Any Unix-like system including macOS, Windows
- Platform: Cross-platform
- Type: double-entry accounting system
- License: GPLv2
- Website: www.sql-ledger.com
- Repository: www.sql-ledger.com/source/

SQL-Ledger is an ERP and double entry accounting system. Accounting data is stored in an SQL database server and a standard web browser can be used as its user interface. The system uses the Perl language with a database interface module for processing and PostgreSQL for data storage which is the preferred platform. The download version also includes schemas for IBM's DB2 database server as well as Oracle.

== Capabilities ==
SQL-Ledger offers all of the standard features of SMB accounting software. Specific customization is available as part of an enterprise support contract.

Not only is the user interface multi-lingual, but it also offers the ability to print out statements, invoices, and the like in the language of the customer, even if the user does not know the language in which the content is being printed.

== Supported languages ==
- English (US, GB)
- Arabic (EG)
- Indonesian
- Brazilian Portuguese
- Bulgarian
- Catalan
- Czech
- Danish
- Dutch (NL, BE)
- Estonian
- Finnish
- French (FR, QC)
- German (DE, CH)
- Greek
- Hungarian
- Icelandic
- Indonesia
- Italian
- Japanese
- Latvian
- Lithuanian
- Norwegian Bokmål
- Polish
- Portuguese
- Russian
- Simplified Chinese
- Slovak
- Spanish (ES, EC, MX, PA, PY, SV, VE)
- Swedish
- Traditional Chinese
- Turkish
- Ukrainian
- tamil
- urdu

== Business model ==
DWS generates their revenue from selling a manual and customizations. For free, DWS provides the source code of the current and all the previous versions, installation instructions, an FAQ collection and a user forum.

Version 3.0 of this program was released under the GNU GPL 2.0 license.

Version 3.2.6 released in December 2017.

== Licensing issues ==
At its inception, SQL-Ledger used the GNU GPL 2.0 license. In 2005, Debian legal questioned whether or not the program belonged in Free or Non-Free, due to wording in the Terms and Conditions notice in the tarball. In late 2006, LedgerSMB was created as a secure fork of SQL-Ledger. In early 2007, SQL-Ledger 2.8 was released under the 'SQL-Ledger Open Source License, a license which retroactively revokes all previous licenses under which the covered code had been released. That version also contained an "anti-forking" clause. However, within a month, SQL-Ledger 2.8.1 was released, under the GNU GPL 2.0.

== See also ==
- LedgerSMB, another fork of version 2.
- Comparison of accounting software
- List of free and open source software packages
