= SciSys =

European computer software and services company

SCISYS - now part of CGI
- Founded: 1980; 45 years ago
- Defunct: 18 December 2019
- Fate: Acquired by CGI Group
- Headquarters: Chippenham, United Kingdom

SCISYS PLC was a pan-European computer software and services company based in the United Kingdom and Germany. The company was formed in 1980 as Science Systems and was acquired by CGI in 2019.

== Overview ==
SCISYS Group PLC was a medium-sized software and IT services company. The dual-listed company (ESM:SCC)/(Lon:SSY) was a l developer of information and communications technology services, e-business, web and mobile applications, editorial newsroom solutions and advanced technology solutions. The SCISYS Group comprised four operational companies: SCISYS UK Ltd, SCISYS Deutschland GmbH, SCISYS Media Solutions GmbH and Xibis Ltd.

== History ==
SCISYS was formed in 1980 as Science Systems and its shares were listed on London's Alternative Investment Market in 1997.

In 2000, Science Systems acquired CODA, an accounting software company, and in 2002 the group holding company was renamed CODASciSys plc. The CODA business was demerged as a separately listed company in 2006. Following the demerger, the original, remaining business became SciSys plc in 2006.

In 2007, SciSys purchased a private Bochum-based German company, VCS AG. VCS produced software, computer systems and telecommunications systems for broadcasting, and services for public- and private-sector satellites.

In January 2012 the VCS business was renamed SCISYS Deutschland GmbH as part of a wider integration exercise. As part of this, in May 2012, the UK operations of SciSys were also rebranded as SCISYS. These two changes brought the business divisions together, operating under the same name and branding.

In October 2012, SCISYS purchased the space-market elements of the German company MakaluMedia.

In December 2014, SCISYS announced the acquisition of Xibis Limited, a mobile and web-development firm.

In November 2016, SCISYS announced the acquisition of ANNOVA Systems GmbH a provider of software solutions for media and broadcast, in particular its OpenMedia newsroom computer systems.

In May 2017, SCISYS announced that the Media & Broadcast division of SCISYS Deutschland has moved from Bochum to new offices in nearby Dortmund. The Bochum location remained the German headquarters and the home of its space division.

In 2018, SCISYS moved its headquarters to Ireland, which was seen as a response to the then-pending Brexit.

In December 2019, SCISYS was acquired by CGI, an independent IT and business consulting services firm.
