= Sybiz =

Sybiz Software
- Type: Private
- Industry: Computer software
- Founded: 1975
- Headquarters: Adelaide, South Australia
- Key people: Grant Argy (Director, Research and Development) Ben O'Brien (Director, Finance and Services)
- Products: Accounting; Payroll; Human Resource Management
- Website: www.sybiz.com

Sybiz Software is a developer of ERP, payroll and HCM software based in Adelaide, Australia.

== History ==
Sybiz Software was founded in 1975 by Malcolm and Pegy Boyd, initially producing applications for Hewlett Packard calculators. Soon after, Sybiz branched out into producing 'microcomputer business software' and released its first integrated accounting system called Sybiz.

In 1991 Sybiz received acclaim for the release of the world's first accounting program for Microsoft Windows 3.0. at Comdex Las Vegas.

Sybiz was acquired by Softline in 1998 which was in turn acquired by The Sage Group plc in 2003. Sybiz began court proceedings against competitor Advanced Business Manager Pty Ltd in 2004, claiming copyright infringement of their flagship accounting program. The case was settled out of court.

In 2005, Sybiz returned to Australian ownership after a management buy-out, now led by Directors Grant Argy (Research and Development) and Ben O'Brien (Finance and Services).

Sybiz expanded its international presence by acquiring New Zealand distributor Revolution Systems in 2008, then acquiring their Ireland-based distributor in 2015, re-branding as Sybiz Europe.

== Products ==
Sybiz maintains 2 core products, Sybiz Vision and Sybiz Visipay, both serving medium-large style businesses across a range of industries.

== Operations ==
Sybiz products are sold through a channel partner network, operating in Australia, New Zealand, Sri Lanka, Singapore, Fiji, Ireland and the UK. Sybiz Head Office is located in Adelaide with offices in Auckland and Dublin, Ireland.

== Primary Competition ==
- Attache
- MYOB EXO
- Arrow
- Greentree
- Netsuite
