= Walker Interactive Products =

American software company, 1980–2003

- Formerly: Elevon; Walker Interactive Systems; Walker Interactive Products; Jeffrey L. Walker & Company
- Type: Public
- Traded as: Nasdaq: WALK
- Industry: Software
- Founded: 1977; 49 years ago (as a products company) in Mill Valley, California, U.S.
- Founder: Jeffrey Walker
- Defunct: 2003
- Fate: Acquired by SSA Global Technologies
- Headquarters: San Francisco, California, U.S.
- Key people: Jeffrey Walker; Bruce Coleman; David Brownlee; Leonard Liu
- Products: Accounts Payable/Purchase Order; General Ledger; Inventory Management

Walker Interactive Products, earlier known as Jeffrey L. Walker & Company and later known as Walker Interactive Systems (or simply Walker Interactive, Inc.) and then briefly Elevon, Inc., was an American software company of the late 1970s through the early 2000s that was known for making accounting software for large organizations. The Walker application packages in particular supported the purchase order and accounts payable functionalities, as well as general ledger, and were mainly sold for the IBM mainframe market. For most of its existence, the company was headquartered in the downtown area of San Francisco, California.

== Origins and rapid growth ==
Jeffrey L. Walker & Company was a software consulting firm that began during the 1970s and was run by Jeffrey Walker. It was originally based in Mill Valley, California. By 1977, while most of the firm's business was still in data processing consulting, Walker began selling some of the software he had devised on a product basis, thus beginning its history as a software products company. One such instance was IOSYS, a file system that was touted as being superior to IBM's ISAM and VSAM access methods. Another product was TMS, a table management system. Then in 1978, Jeffrey L. Walker & Company began selling its Accounts Payable/Purchase Order System as a packaged application.

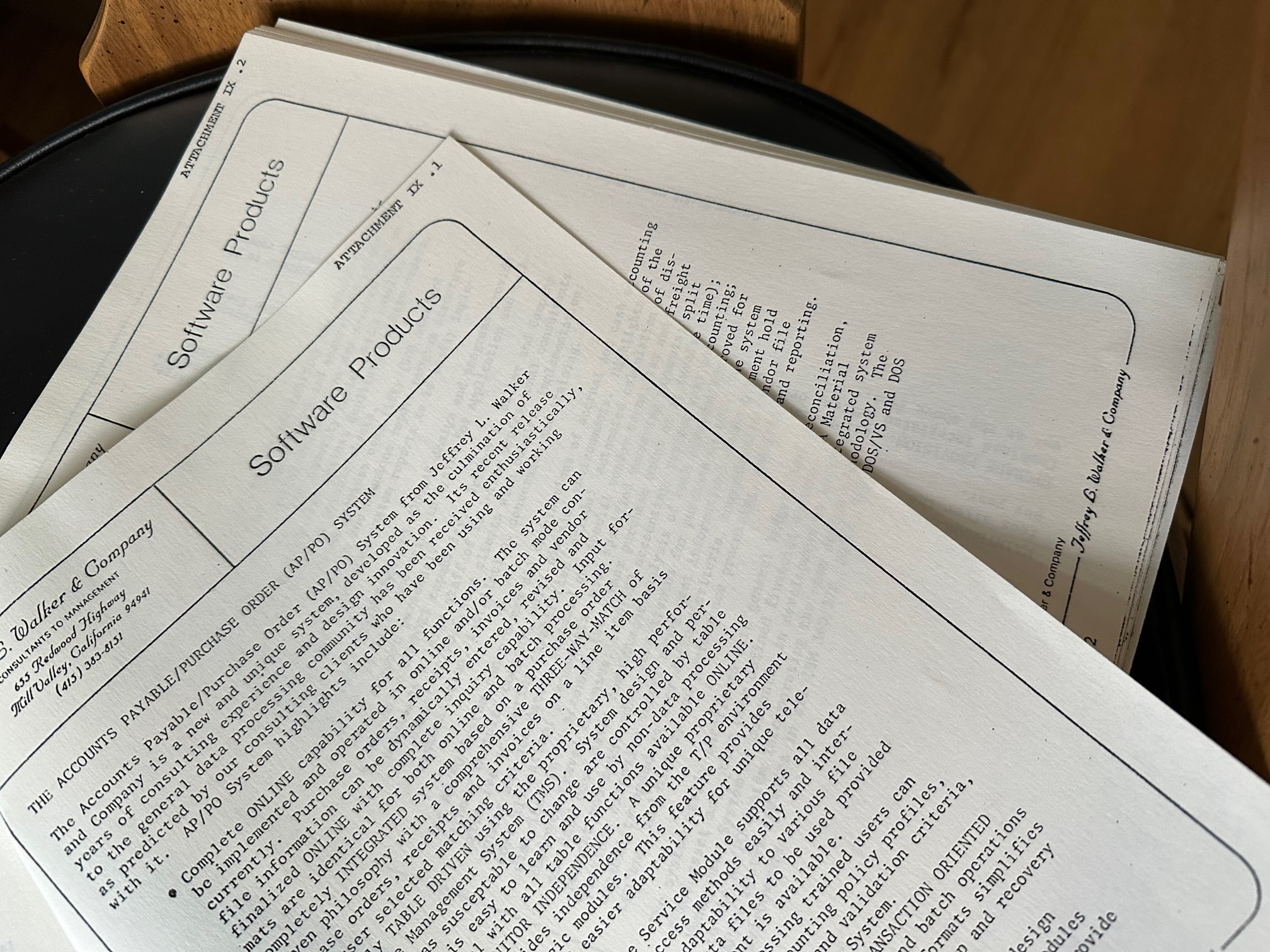
Datasheets for the Accounts Payable/Purchase Order System, dated 1978

While many purchasing/accounts payable products of the time were based on batch processing, from the beginning the Walker product emphasized its online capabilities (although it also contained components that could be run in batch mode). The online-centric architecture of the product, as well as the application features and functionality it presented, were well received within the industry. The Walker product ran on a variety of IBM transaction processing platforms, including CICS, IMS DC, and VM/CMS, as well as interfacing as necessary with IBM's DL/1, VSAM, and SSX/VSE technologies. For sites with no existing database technology to interface to, Walker's own IOSYS would typically be used. Walker's TMS was part of the system as well and could allow end users to specify online aspects of the product's configuration and processing. The Walker product was implemented in a combination of COBOL and IBM 370 Assembly language.

In 1981, using the first of several rounds of venture capital financing, the company was recreated as Walker Interactive Products. Jeffrey Walker was its CEO, as well as a designer of its products.

The company stressed the need for fast growth at the expense of profitability, in part built around heavy marketing, and its revenues increased from $1 million in 1980 to $20 million in 1984, in some years showing 200 percent sales growth. The Walker products competed against those from the financial software industry mainstays Management Science America, McCormack & Dodge, and Cullinet Software. In the process, the company went through over $21 million in venture capital monies.

== Near-bankruptcy and reorganization ==
However, Walker product quality was a serious issue, especially with respect to installations. By 1985 sales were falling rapidly, expense levels were such that the company was on the edge of bankruptcy, and no more venture capital was forthcoming. The company's board of directors dismissed Jeffrey Walker. They replaced him with Bruce Coleman, formerly an executive with Informatics General and Boole & Babbage.

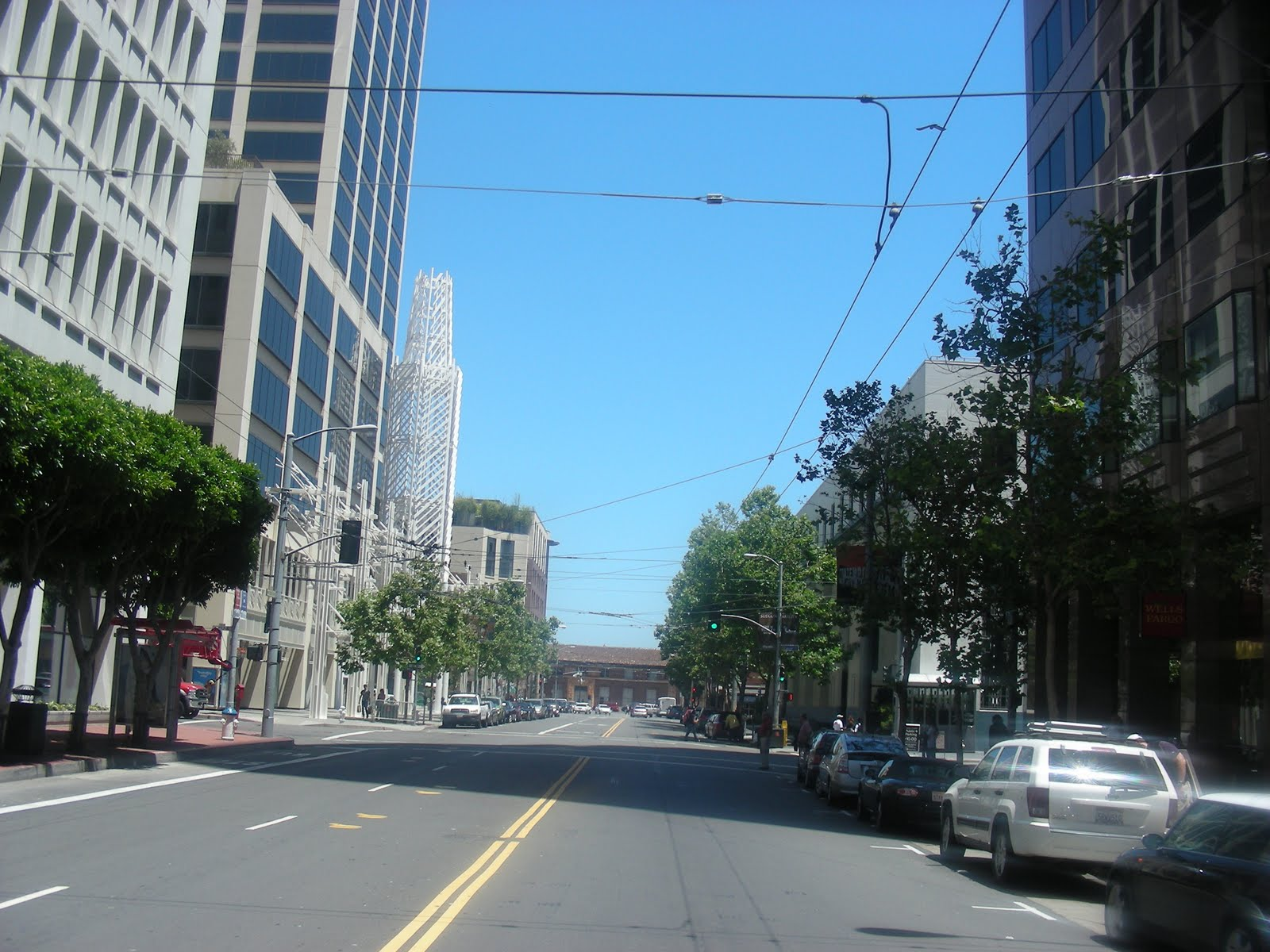
In the 1980s, Walker Interactive's offices were at 100 Mission Street in San Francisco, just to the left of this scene from 2009

Reports in the trade press at this time indicated the company was up for sale. Accel Partners acted as a facilitator in this process. But no sale could be found; even Computer Associates, which specialized in buying companies in the mainframe software industry, was not interested. Instead, the company conducted a large-scale layoff to drastically reduce ongoing expenses: by one later recollection, over a single weekend the company was reduced from 192 people to 72. All of Walker's branch offices were shuttered, with what operations remained moved to the San Francisco headquarters.

Coleman then departed the following year, using this experience to embrace a career in turnaround management. Leadership of the company was assumed by David Brownlee, who had been head of the firm's operation in the United Kingdom.

After having suffered losses for most of its existence, the company finally became profitable for several years. It refocused its technology base around the IBM DB/2 data management line.

== Public company and acquisition ==
Walker Interactive Systems, Inc. went public in 1992 on the NASDAQ exchange. It was listed under the symbol WALK.

The advent of client–server computing posed a challenge for the company, however, as the technological shift threatened to erode Walker's mainframe-based revenue stream. Walker had an internal development initiative to support the client–server model, but it was abandoned during 1994 and instead the company used technology from Financial Solutions Ltd, a firm that was acquired that same year. Walker lost money for 1994 and had a substantial layoff, leaving it with 428 employees. In 1995, Brownlee stepped down as CEO and was replaced by Leonard Liu. For 1995, Software Magazine ranked Walker Interactive Systems 70th in its list of the top 100 independent software companies, based on total revenues of almost $70 million.

In 2001, Walker Interactive was delisted from NASDAQ for failing to meet minimum requirements for net tangible assets. In 2002, the company began doing business under the name Elevon, Inc. The company said that "the Walker brand associates the Company mainly with mainframe financial software" and that instead it wanted a branding that could be associated with its recent emphasis on "collaborative commerce solutions on a greater range of hardware platforms."

Then in 2003, Elevon was acquired by SSA Global Technologies, for a price of about $20 million. The action was part of a wave of consolidation in the enterprise resource planning space, with SSA typically acquiring companies that were in financial distress.
