= Open Systems Accounting Software =

Business accounting software package

- Developers: Open Systems, Inc.
- Stable release: 7.6; November 1, 2010
- Operating system: Windows XP or later, Linux, Mac OS X
- Type: Accounting software
- Website: www.osas.com/osas

Open Systems Accounting Software (OSAS) is a business accounting software package for small- to medium-sized businesses using the Microsoft Windows, Linux, and Mac OS X operating systems. It has been developed and sold since 1976 by Open Systems, Inc. of Shakopee, MN.

OSAS is currently programmed in the Java-based BBj language developed by BASIS International. The Java implementation allows installation of OSAS on a variety of platforms.

== See also ==
- Traverse (software)
