= InDinero =

American accounting software and services company

indinero
- Company type: Private
- Industry: Software as a service
- Founded: 2009; 17 years ago
- Key people: Jessica Mah (Founder, CEO), Andy Su (Founder, Board Member)
- Products: Accounting software, Financial software, Virtual CFO, Bookkeeping, Tax return preparation
- Number of employees: 219 (2019)
- Website: www.indinero.com

Indinero is an accounting software and services company providing accounting and financial software. Founded in 2009 by Jess Mah, Andy Su, and Andrea Barrica, indinero graduated the startup incubator, Y Combinator in 2010. On May 8, 2018, indinero acquired San Jose-based firm tempCFO. On February 1, 2019, indinero acquired a second company, mAccounting, an Indianapolis-based accounting and tax firm.

== History ==
Jessica Mah started the initial development of indinero at age 19 after meeting her co-founder Andy Su at UC Berkeley. Upon graduating from Y Combinator in August 2010, indinero gained angel attention. In February 2013, indinero received the largest of a three-fund investment from FundersClub in their initial investment in enterprise software companies.

By 2014, the company had 75 employees.

Two years later, in February 2015, indinero closed its largest funding round, a Series B round worth $7 million. Similar competitors include Bench, Botkeeper, and BooksTime.

In March 2015, the company opened an office in Portland, Oregon.

=== Software ===
Indinero's software combines accounting, tax filing and payroll management for small businesses with up to 100 employees. In addition, accountants and tax specialists manually review customers' financial statements.
