= D&B Software =

American computer software company, 1990–1996

D&B Software Services
- Type: Subsidiary
- Industry: Computer software
- Founded: 1990
- Defunct: 1996
- Fate: Acquired by Geac
- Headquarters: Atlanta, Georgia and Natick, Massachusetts, US
- Parent: Dun & Bradstreet

Dun & Bradstreet Software Services, often shortened to D&B Software, was an American computer software company formed by the merger of the Management Science America and McCormack & Dodge companies in June 1990, under the ownership of the Dun & Bradstreet corporation. In 1982, McCormack & Dodge was described by The New York Times as "one of the nation's top three financial software concerns."

== History ==
Management Science America was founded in Atlanta, Georgia, and grew to be one of the largest mainframe software vendors under CEO John Imlay, who joined in 1970.

After the June 1990 merger, the separate company headquarters of MSA and McCormack & Dodge, located in Massachusetts and Atlanta, respectively, were retained, with videoconferencing used for communication. Originally, the merged company was a supplier of financial packages that ran on mainframe computers. In 1991, they released the client-server middleware application suite named SmartStream that ran on HP-UX. Smartstream 3.0 was introduced in early 1995.

== Geac ==
In 1996, D&B Software was acquired for US$150 million by the Canadian client-server application firm Geac Computer Corporation, who immediately split the services into two divisions.

== See also ==
- Informatics General
- Walker Interactive Products
