= Financial close management =

Financial close management (FCM) is a recurring process in management accounting by which accounting teams verify and adjust account balances at the end of a designated period in order to produce financial reports representative of the company's true financial position to inform stakeholders such as management, investors, lenders, and regulatory agencies. The process starts with recording transactions as journal entries and end with preparing the financial reports for the period.

== Overview ==
Closing the books involves consolidating transactions from multiple accounts, reconciling the information to ensure its validity, and identifying irregularities and errors that need to be adjusted. Accountants typically perform the close process monthly or annually. In the end, the trial balance — the list of all accounts from the general ledger — must balance: The sum of all debts must equal the sum of all credits.

== Fluctuation analysis ==
In addition to reconciliations and adjustments, accounting teams track the health of the company by conducting fluctuation analysis (flux analysis). Flux analysis involves aggregating data from multiple periods and identifying material fluctuations from period to period, and what caused them. This helps businesses identify warning signs before they turn into major issues, though — given the labor-intensive nature of the month-end close — many businesses struggle to find the time and energy to conduct a thorough fluctuation analysis.

== Reporting ==
Businesses report differently based on their stakeholders and other interested parties.

For small businesses, reporting on a cash basis is considered adequate. For larger businesses, typically backed by investors, it is necessary to provide more in-depth reporting based on Generally Accepted Account Principles (GAAP) in the United States and International Financial Reporting Standards (IFRS) elsewhere. These principles are a set of rules for accurate and consistent financial reporting and are mandatory for publicly traded companies.

== See also ==
- Accounting
- Accounting software
- Bookkeeping
