= Informer Computer Terminals =

American computer company (1971–2007)

Informer Computer Systems, Inc.
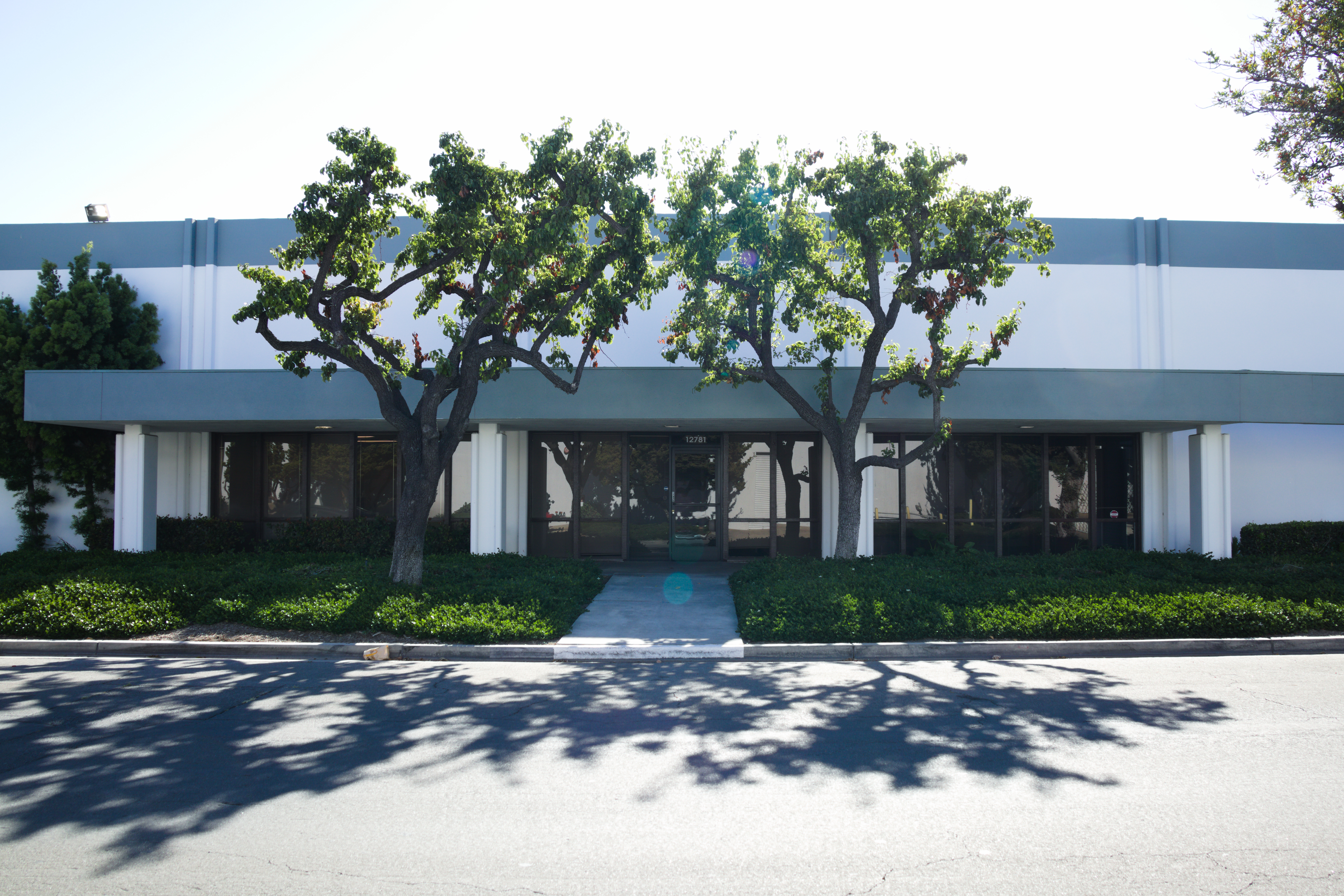
- Former headquarters in Garden Grove, California (pictured in 2021)
- Formerly: Informer, Inc.; Informer Computer Terminals, Inc.
- Type: Private
- Industry: Computers
- Founded: 1971; 55 years ago in Los Angeles, California
- Founder: Donald Allen Domike
- Defunct: 2007; 19 years ago
- Fate: Dissolution
- Products: Computer terminals (glass, teleprinters)

Informer Computer Terminals, Inc., originally Informer, Inc., and later Informer Computer Systems, Inc., was a privately held American computer company active from 1971 to 2007. It manufactured data terminals that could communicate with mainframes and minicomputers, mainly those manufactured by IBM and Digital. It was originally based in Los Angeles, California; in the early 1980s, it moved to Laguna Beach, and in the late 1980s, to Garden Grove.

== Corporate history ==
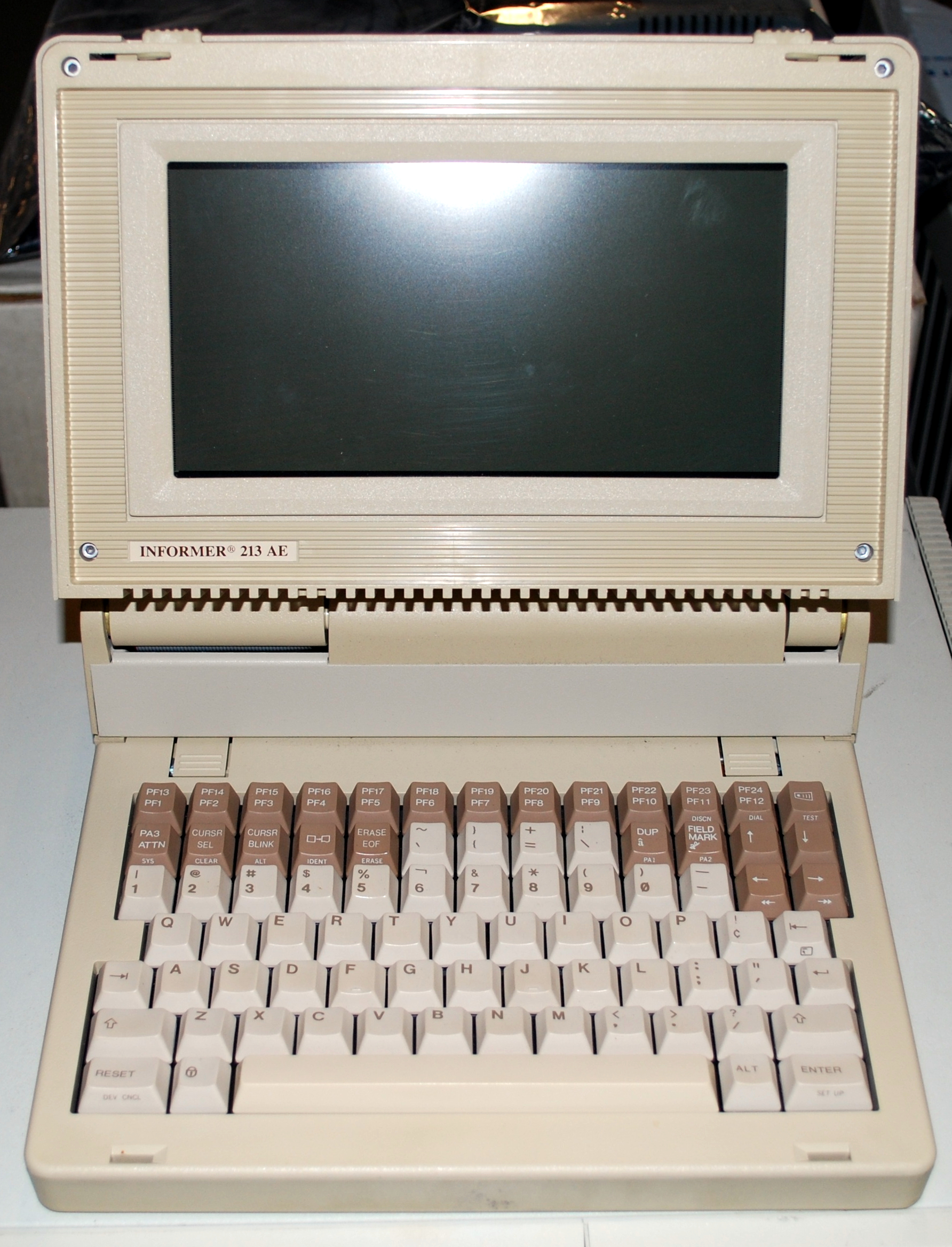
Informer's 213AE terminal, released in 1991

Informer, Inc. was co-founded in Los Angeles, California, in 1971 by Donald Allen Domike (1927–2017). Originally located in the far corner of West Los Angeles, Informer moved to Westchester, Los Angeles, in fall 1976, occupying a 20,000-square-foot (1,900 m^{2}) facility as their headquarters, manufacturing plant, and research and development laboratory. Informer in the mid-1970s appointed Bryon Cole as president of the company and Wilfred "Will" R. Little as vice president of marketing. By 1981, Little replaced Cole as president.

Informer in 1976 manufactured glass terminals with small CRTs as well as traditional keyboard-send-and-receive and receive-only teleprinters. It achieved sales of US$1 million in fiscal year 1976, projecting a doubling of sales for the following year. By 1981, the company had achieved yearly sales in excess of $10 million. The company established ten branch offices in the United States by that year; at some point in the mid-1980s, they also opened a Canadian subsidiary in Richmond, British Columbia.

Its products in the early 1980s comprised not only glass terminals and teleprinters but also barcode readers and batch terminals. Informer's terminals were used for data entry, data monitoring, remote job entry, and software programming. Following struggling sales in the mid-1980s, the company appointed Malcolm K. Green, formerly of Emulex as president and CEO. Green shortly thereafter relocated the company's headquarters to Garden Grove, California.

By the early 1990s the company had renamed itself to Informer Computer Systems, Inc. In 1994, the company spun off its local area and dial-up networking security software operations as Informer Data Security, Inc. Bradley Little was named president of the new company. Beginning in the mid-1990s, the company began orienting their products toward state emergency services, manufacturing terminals and call-tracking systems for 9-1-1 call centers, though they still offered general-purpose terminals as well. Edward P. Dailey replaced Little as president and CEO around this time. In 2000, the company employed 20 in Garden Grove.

Informer went defunct in 2007.

== Products ==
In May 1990, the company unveiled the Informer 213PT, a portable terminal that also doubles as an IBM PC compatible computer, complete with an Intel 80386SX processor and MS-DOS 3.3 in ROM. The 213PT contains a 9,600-bit/s V.32 modem that establishes connections with IBM mainframes using the 3270 terminal protocol. Switching between terminal and PC modes is achieved via a single keystroke. In PC mode, the computer relies on a host server to provide applications, as it lacks any drive bays for mass storage, including floppy disks and hard disks. The 213PT has 1 MB of RAM and an additional 4 MB of RAM acting as a solid-state drive; the contents of the latter are kept preserved for up to a month when the unit is powered off through the use of an internal battery. The 213PT has an active-matrix electroluminescent display, with a grid of pixels providing EGA resolution. Informer followed this up in 1991 with the Informer 213AE, a cheaper asynchronous terminal that used an emulator to convert DEC VT100 protocol to 3270 protocol. The 213AE does not include the PC-compatible element of the 213PT, but keeps the electroluminescent display.
