= Masternaut =

British telematics company

Masternaut Limited
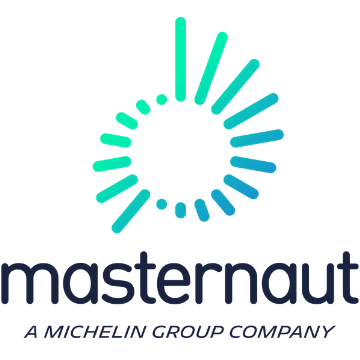
- Former logo of Masternaut
- Type: Subsidiary
- Industry: Telematics
- Founded: 1996; 30 years ago
- Founder: Serge Deleau
- Headquarters: London, England, UK
- Key people: Dhruv S. Parekh (CEO)
- Parent: Michelin
- Website: www.masternaut.com

Masternaut Limited is a British telematics company that provides fleet management, fleet management software, asset tracking, and vehicle tracking services. It has been a subsidiary of Michelin since 2019 and operates under the brand MICHELIN Connected Fleet, having previously traded as Masternaut.

== History ==
The company was founded in France in 1996 by Serge Deleau as SDM.

During the late 2000s, the UK telematics provider Cybit made several acquisitions in the sector, including Thales Telematics from Thales Group in 2007 and the German telematics provider Truck24 in 2008 for €4 million. In 2009, private equity firm Francisco Partners acquired Cybit Holdings plc in a £23 million deal, taking the company private.

In 2011, Francisco Partners merged Masternaut with Cybit in a deal valued at £100 million. Two years later, the combined business acquired Three X, a mobile workforce management software company, from GE. In 2014, Masternaut was sold to Summit Partners and Fleetcor, and Dhruv S. Parekh was appointed chief executive officer in 2015.

Michelin acquired Masternaut in 2019 as part of its expansion into fleet telematics services.

== Operations ==
Masternaut's services use GPS technology to support automatic vehicle location, asset tracking, and vehicle tracking, with data transmitted over GPRS and GSM mobile networks and made available to customers through a web-based platform, Masternaut Connect.

Hardware can be installed via a vehicle's CAN bus, its OBD-II port, or a 12-volt socket. The company has signed factory-fit telematics agreements with vehicle manufacturers including Vauxhall, PSA and Renault, and supplies pre-equipped vehicles through fleet-leasing companies including Fraikin, Petit Forestier and Lex Autolease.
