= AME Accounting Software =

Business accounting software application

- Developer(s): AME Software Products, Inc.
- Initial release: 2004
- Written in: Visual Basic
- Operating system: Windows
- Available in: English
- Type: Accounting
- License: Proprietary
- Website: amesoftware.com

AME Accounting Software is a business accounting software application developed by AME Software Products, Inc. AME Accounting Software includes Payroll, General Ledger, Accounts Receivable, Accounts Payable, 1099 Vendor Management, MICR check printing, and Direct Deposit. The software is mostly used by small and medium-size businesses, as well as accounting practices that process payroll and do bookkeeping for other businesses. AME stands for Accounting Made Easy.

The General Ledger software implements a double-entry bookkeeping system, and all modules can post entries to General Ledger. The General Ledger software features comprehensive reports, that include Income Statement, Balance Sheet, Cash Flow Statement, Trial Balance Worksheet. The Payroll software calculates federal and state taxes, prints W2, 1099, and payroll checks, and is capable of producing reports for 50 states.

== History ==
AME Accounting Software was initially developed for DOS. In 1998, AME released payroll software for Windows. The current version, AME 2.0, released in 2004, includes all features that are required for running a small business or an accounting practice.

As noted in the 2008 June/July issue of CPA Technology Advisor Magazine: "AME offers a good payroll module and core financial functions that are sufficient for smaller entities, especially for businesses with limited technical expertise. It is attractively priced and covers the basic needs of a small company."
