= Rent.com.au =

Australian rental property portal

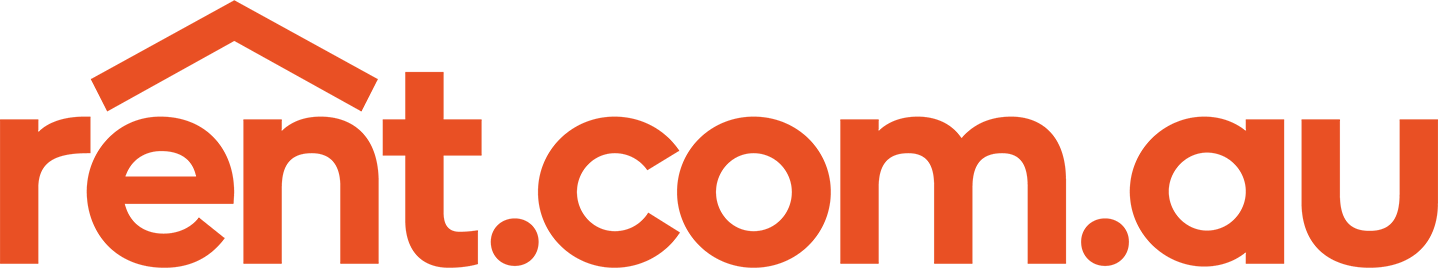
- Type: Public company
- Traded as: ASX: RNT
- Founded: 2007
- Headquarters: 3 Craig Street, Burswood, Western Australia
- Key people: Greg Bader (CEO)
- Brands: rent.com.au rentpay.com.au lease.com.au
- Website: www.rent.com.au

Rent.com.au (or simply Rent) is an Australian-based company that runs rent.com.au, a dedicated Australian rental property portal. It is listed on the Australian Securities Exchange as ASX:RNT.

== History ==
Rent.com.au was established in 2007 to address a gap in the market for a real estate portal that specifically catered to the needs of Australian renters. For the first two years, the company focused on developing a website front end and ensuring sufficient property listings content was available to provide renters with the widest choice of rental properties possible. To achieve this, Rent.com.au integrated with over 60 different real estate software providers between March 2007 and March 2015, allowing real estate agents to automate property listings onto rent.com.au.

Rent.com.au was one of a few portals that allowed private landlords (those not using a real estate agent) to list their properties on the site. Early revenues were low and derived mainly from property listing fees and other advertising sources.

In 2018 Rent.com.au launched its mobile app in both the Google and Apple app stores.

Rent.com.au Limited began trading on the ASX on 23 June 2015 with an initial market capitalisation of $17.5 million.

In the first six years since its initial ASX listing, Rent.com.au has raised a further $24 million across several capital raisings, with significant investors including Charles Tarbey (chairman of Century 21 real estate) and Bevan Slattery (Australian technology entrepreneur).

== Products and revenue model ==
From 2013, Rent.com.au began offering products designed to help renters apply for and move into properties, including identity verification and background checking product RentCheck. In 2019 the company announced it had launched a utility connection service called RentConnect, currently partnered with Origin Energy.

In late 2016 Rent.com.au launched its Renter Resume online profile and application system, which, together with the Pet Resume feature, more than 1 million people had used by 17 February 2021 to make their rental experience easier.

In May 2021, the company extended its reach into the tenancy period with the launch of its RentPay platform, which gave renters the ability to control their rental payments. RentPay allowed them to set when and how much they paid in rent whilst ensuring the agent or landlord received the correct rent on time.

Rent.com.au's main focus is renter products, which account for approximately 50% of its revenue. The remaining primarily comes from advertisers wishing to access this renter audience.
