= Reckon (company) =

Australian software company

Reckon Limited
- Company type: Public
- Traded as: ASX: RKN
- Industry: Information Technology
- Founded: 1987
- Founder: Greg Wilkinson
- Headquarters: North Sydney, Australia
- Key people: Sam Allert, CEO
- Products: Accounting software
- Number of employees: 180+
- Website: www.reckon.com

Reckon is an Australian software company that provides desktop and cloud-based accounting software for accountants, bookkeepers, small to medium businesses, and personal users. Reckon provides software solutions in Australia, New Zealand (As Reckon NZ), and in the US (via its subsidiary nQ Zebraworks, a billing software service). Reckon is listed on the Australian Securities Exchange with a market cap of A$65,000,000. Reckon has over 100,000 businesses using its software across Australia and New Zealand.

== History ==
Reckon Limited was founded by Greg Wilkinson in 1987, who was its chief executive officer until 2006. Funded initially with the $2,000 credit limit on a friend's credit card, Greg Wilkinson started republishing and distributing Quicken & QuickBooks software products in Australia under a licensing agreement with Intuit. For over 25 years, Reckon managed the marketing, distribution and development of these products.

In 2012, Intuit announced the decision to take back the QuickBooks & Quicken name, release a cloud accounting program called QuickBooks Online and start selling it in Australia. Reckon continues to sell QuickBooks desktop accounting software under its own brand, Reckon Accounts. The Australian version of the Quicken personal finance products were renamed Reckon Accounts Personal in late 2012.

In 2014, Reckon launched a cloud accounting program called Reckon One.

In August 2017, Reckon completed the demerger of its Document Management division into a new London-based company called GetBusy. Since then, Reckon has expanded its business ecosystem to include various products, such as Reckon Loans for business financing.

In May 2022, Reckon agreed to sell its Reckon Accountants Group to UK-based Access Group for A$100 million. The deal included Reckon's APS and Reckon Elite software. The acquisition was completed in August 2022.

In December 2024, Reckon acquired Cashflow Manager and Okke software solutions from the Money Management group for A$8.75 million. This acquisition saw Reckon absorb Cashflow Manager and Okke’s 20,000 customers, as well as 1,000 accounting and bookkeeping partners.

== Products ==
Reckon has a suite of products that include:

- Cloud accounting and payroll software
- Invoicing and payroll apps
- STP Reporting
- Desktop accounting and payroll software
- Business finance loans

Reckon also provides billing software for law firms through its subsidiary, nQ Zebraworks, which is predominantly based in the United States.

Reckon also has integration partnerships with many software providers to complement its accounting and payroll software services.
