= Unit4 =

Dutch business software company

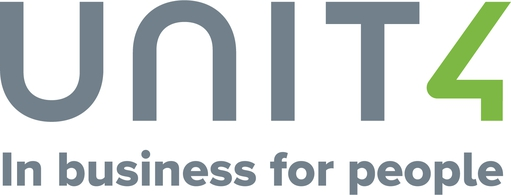
- Type: Private
- Industry: Cloud computing software, software
- Founded: 1980
- Key people: Simon Paris CEO
- Products: ERP; FP&A; Human Capital Management
- Services: Software; Professional services
- Revenue: €372.2 million (2019)
- Number of employees: 2,400
- Website: www.unit4.com

Unit4 is an Enterprise Resource Software company that designs and delivers enterprise software and ERP applications and related professional services for people in services organizations, with a special focus on the professional services, education, public services, and nonprofit sectors. It has subsidiaries and offices in 23 countries across Europe, North America, the Asia-Pacific region and Africa.

The company is best known for its People Experience Suite including Unit4 ERP, Unit4 Financials, Unit4 FP&A, and Unit4 Talent Management. In 2015, Unit4 announced a partnership with Microsoft to build self-driving business applications on the Microsoft Azure cloud. Unit4's software is available in either cloud or on-premises setups, with support for on-premise ending in December 2024. In 2020, the company launched a Global Channel Partner Programme to aid partners in implementing Unit4 software.

== History ==
Unit4 was founded in 1980 by Chris Ouwinga and listed on the Amsterdam Stock Exchange in 1998.

In 2000, Unit4 merged with the Norwegian ERP software house Agresso Group ASA and the company name was changed to Unit4Agresso.

In March 2014, Unit4 was acquired by international venture capital firm Advent International.

In 2015, Unit4 rebranded its Coda financial management software package as Unit4 Financials. The Unit4 People Platform was also launched in 2015 as the foundation for Unit4 business applications using Microsoft Azure technology.

In April 2019, Mike Ettling, former president of SAP SuccessFactors and CEO of NGA Human Resources, became Unit4's CEO.

Global growth private equity firm TA Associates announced the strategic growth buy out of Unit4 for more than $2billion in March 2021. Global private markets firm, Partners Group, invested alongside TA. In April 2021, Unit4 released ERPx, its next-generation intelligent Enterprise Resource Planning (ERP) solution built for mid-market, people-centric organizations.

In January 2025, Unit4 announced that Simon Paris had been appointed as CEO, succeeding Mike Ettling, who had led Unit4 for almost six years.

== Acquisitions ==
Acquisitions by Unit4
Acquisition number	Acquired company	Acquisition date	Specialty	Country of origin	Acquisition costs
9	Scanmarket	2022	Source to contract	Denmark	
8	Compright	2021	Compensation planning	US	
7	Intuo	2019	Talent management	Belgium	
6	Assistance	2017	Professional services	Netherlands	
5	Prevero	2016	CPM	Germany	
4	Three Rivers	2015	Education	US	
3	Prosoft	2015	Human resource management	Asia	
2	Teta	2010	Accounting and services	Poland	
1	Unit4 Financials by Coda	2008	Accounting	UK	
