= Nexient Learning =

- Type: Subsidiary
- Industry: Education
- Founded: 1963 in Winnipeg, Manitoba and Sydney, Nova Scotia
- Defunct: 2009
- Fate: Acquired
- Successor: Global Knowledge Training
- Headquarters: Toronto, Ontario, Canada
- Key people: President & CEO: Donna de Winter
- Products: IT, business process improvement, and leadership business solutions training. See
- Number of employees: Approximately 200 (2009)
- Parent: Global Knowledge Training
- Website: nexientlearning.com globalknowledge.com

Nexient Learning (formerly CrossOff Incorporated) was a Canadian corporate training provider. Nexient Learning was based in Toronto, Ontario, and since 2009 has been a subsidiary of Global Knowledge of Cary, North Carolina.

As of 2009, Nexient Learning trained over 100,000 students at all experience and organization levels each year. With courses and development programs in Information Technology, Business Process Improvement and Leadership and Business Skills, Nexient is the only provider in Canada to offer training in all business and Information Technology disciplines.

== History ==
Nexient Learning was created out of a series of acquisitions and mergers among some of Canada's largest skills development firms. The primary companies involved in recent years include CrossOff Incorporated's wholly owned subsidiary Polar Bear Corporate Education Solutions formerly IBM's PBSC, Acerra Learning, and CDI Corporate Education Services. Other Canadian firms which became part of Nexient Learning through prior mergers include BroadLeaf (formerly Keltic Learning Centres), ExecuTrain, KnowledgeAbility, Salient, CompuLearn and InterNet Training Group.

On June 26, 2009, Nexient Learning announced that it had entered into creditor protection under the Companies' Creditors Arrangement Act (Canada), to allow Nexient Learning to conduct a sale process of its assets and to provide financing to continue operations without disruption. On August 24, 2009, Global Knowledge Training announced the completion of the acquisition of the assets of Nexient Learning, which now operates as a wholly owned subsidiary of Global Knowledge.
