= Accounting software =

Computer program that maintains account books

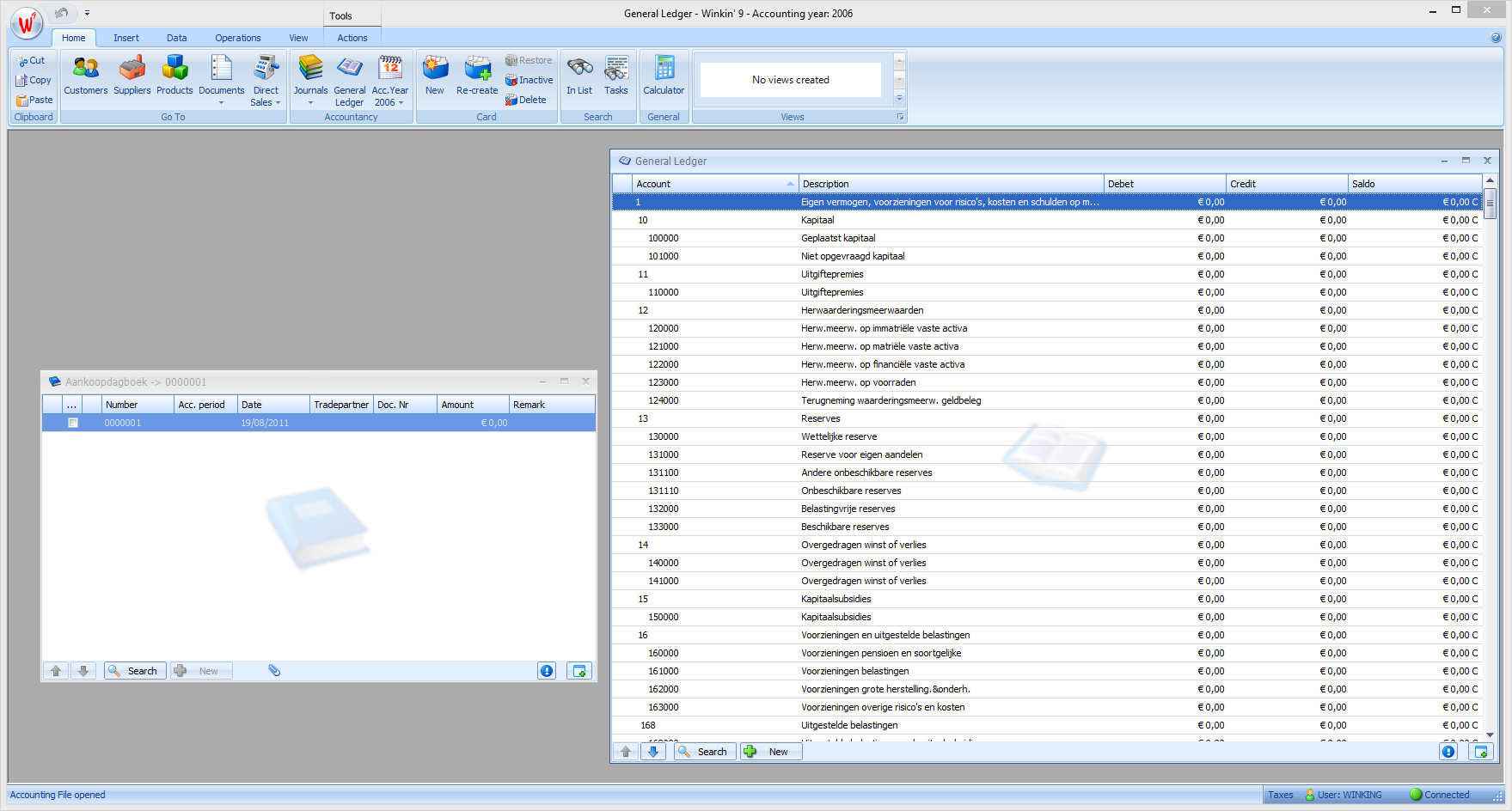
Example of General Ledger and purchase journal in a Belgian accounting program

Accounting software is a computer program that maintains account books on computers, including recording transactions and account balances. It may depend on virtual thinking. Depending on the purpose, the software can manage budgets, perform accounting tasks for multiple currencies, perform payroll and customer relationship management, and prepare financial reporting. Work to have accounting functions be implemented on computers goes back to the earliest days of electronic data processing. Over time, accounting software has revolutionized from supporting basic accounting operations to performing real-time accounting and supporting financial processing and reporting. Cloud accounting software was first introduced in 2011, and it allowed the performance of all accounting functions through the internet.

== Modules ==
Accounting software is typically composed of various modules, with different sections dealing with particular areas of accounting. Among the most common are:

Core modules

- Accounts receivable—where the company enters money received
- Accounts payable—where the company enters its bills and pays money it owes
- General ledger—the company's "books"
- Billing—where the company produces invoices to clients/customers
- Stock/inventory—where the company keeps control of its inventory
- Purchase order—where the company orders inventory
- Sales order—where the company records customer orders for the supply of inventory
- Bookkeeping—where the company records collection and payment
- Financial close management — where accounting teams verify and adjust account balances at the end of a designated time period

Non-core modules

- Debt collection—where the company tracks attempts to collect overdue bills (sometimes part of accounts receivable)
- Electronic payment processing
- Expense—where employee business-related expenses are entered
- Inquiries—where the company looks up information on screen without any edits or additions
- Payroll—where the company tracks salary, wages, and related taxes
- Reports—where the company prints out data
- Timesheet—where professionals (such as attorneys and consultants) record time worked so that it can be billed to clients
- Purchase requisition—where requests for purchase orders are made, approved and tracked
- Reconciliation—compares records from parties at both sides of transactions for consistency
- Drill down
- Journals
- Departmental accounting
- Support for value added taxation
- Calculation of statutory holdback
- Late payment reminders
- Bank feed integration
- Document attachment system
- Document/Journal approval system

Note that vendors may use differing names for these modules.

== Implementation ==
In many cases, implementation (i.e. the installation and configuration of the system at the client) can be a bigger consideration than the actual software chosen when it comes down to the total cost of ownership for the business. Most mid-market and larger applications are sold exclusively through resellers, developers, and consultants. Those organizations generally pass on a license fee to the software vendor and then charge the client for installation, customization, and support services. Clients can normally count on paying roughly 50-200% of the price of the software in implementation and consulting fees.

== Types ==
=== Personal accounting ===
Personal accounting software is simple in design and is used mostly for individuals. Some activities that it supports are accounts payable-type accounting transactions, managing budgets, and simple account reconciliation. It is relatively inexpensive compared to the other accounting options. One of the more common uses of personal accounting software is for tax preparation. This software is used to file tax returns in a format accepted by national tax authorities, such as the Internal Revenue Service (IRS) in the United States. An example of such software would be TurboTax.

=== Low-end market ===
At the low-end of the business markets, inexpensive applications software allows most general business accounting functions to be performed. Suppliers frequently serve a single national market, while larger suppliers offer separate solutions in each national market.

Many of the low end products are characterized by being "single-entry" products, as opposed to double-entry systems seen in many businesses. Some products have considerable functionality but are not considered GAAP or IFRS/FASB compliant. Some low-end systems do not have adequate security nor audit trails.

=== Mid-market ===
The mid-market covers a wide range of business software that may be capable of serving the needs of multiple national accountancy standards and allow accounting in multiple currencies.

In addition to general accounting functions, the software may include integrated or add-on management information systems, and may be oriented towards one or more markets, for example with integrated or add-on project accounting modules.

Software applications in this market typically include the following features:

- Industry-standard robust databases
- Industry-standard reporting tools
- Tools for configuring or extending the application (e.g. an SDK), access to program code.

=== High-end market ===
Accounting software for large organizations was typically the province of mainframe computers. Organizations could either develop their own software, to model their internal financial processes, or buy a commercial package and tailor it to their needs. By the 1970s and 1980s, some of the software companies making accounting packages for the IBM mainframe market were Management Science America, McCormack & Dodge, Walker Interactive Products, Informatics General, and Cullinet Software.

Over time, the most complex and expensive business accounting software became frequently part of an extensive suite of software often known as enterprise resource planning (ERP) software. These applications typically have a very long implementation period, often greater than six months. In many cases, these applications consist of a set of core functions that require significant integration, configuration, and customization to function as a complete accounting system.

Many freeware high-end open-source accounting software are available online these days which aim to change the market dynamics. Most of these software solutions are web-based.

The advantage of a high-end solution is that these systems are designed to support individual company specific processes, as they are highly customizable and can be tailored to exact business requirements. This usually comes at a significant cost in terms of money and implementation time.

=== Hybrid software ===
As technology improves, software vendors have been able to offer increasingly advanced software at lower prices. This software is suitable for companies at multiple stages of growth. Many of the features of mid-market and high-end software (including advanced customization and extremely scalable databases) are required even by small businesses as they open multiple locations or grow in size. Additionally, with more and more companies expanding overseas or allowing workers to work from home, many smaller clients have a need to connect multiple locations. Their options are to employ software-as-a-service or another application that offers them similar accessibility from multiple locations over the internet.

=== SaaS accounting software ===
With the advent of faster computers and internet connections, accounting software companies have been able to create accounting software which is paid for on a monthly recurring charge instead of a larger upfront license fee (software as a service - SaaS). The rate of adoption of this new business model has increased steadily to the point where legacy players have been forced to come out with their own online versions.

=== Cloud accounting software ===
Cloud accounting software is where financial information can be accessed from any device connected to the Internet at any time even though the financial data itself is located at a centralized computer. This differs from more traditional accounting software as it is restricted to a certain computer or system of computers and that accounting information can not be easily accessed from other devices. Some reasons cloud accounting software is preferred by users is there is no need to worry about maintenance or hardware system upgrades, it can reduce overall costs, and that a user can gain access from multiple locations. One of the primary reasons cloud accounting software is not being used is the threat of the security of the data.

== Data Privacy and Security ==
Privacy in cloud computing is in constant risk of disclosure when in possession of a third party. Factors resulting in distrust of privacy include unauthorized access, unpredictability, and nonconformity. Security threats vary from different cloud environments and interactions and can cause significant risks that must be considered specific to that origin. Unauthorization is a threat stemming from allowing third party organizations to handle an individual's data and the user not having full control. Lack of user control is the effect of keeping data in the cloud, as opposed to one's own local host, and increases user's level of unpredictability. Legislative complexity impacts cloud computing in where the data is being stored and the laws that data in that location, or locations, must follow. While cloud computing and traditional IT environments may pose differing privacy issues, the security controls are generally similar.

== See also ==
- Accounting
  - Index of accounting articles
- Comparison of accounting software
- Double-entry bookkeeping system
- E-accounting
- Enterprise resource planning
- Tax compliance software
- Accounting standard
