= Norman Blackwell, Baron Blackwell =

British businessman, public servant, politician, campaigner and policy advisor

The Right Honourable The Lord Blackwell
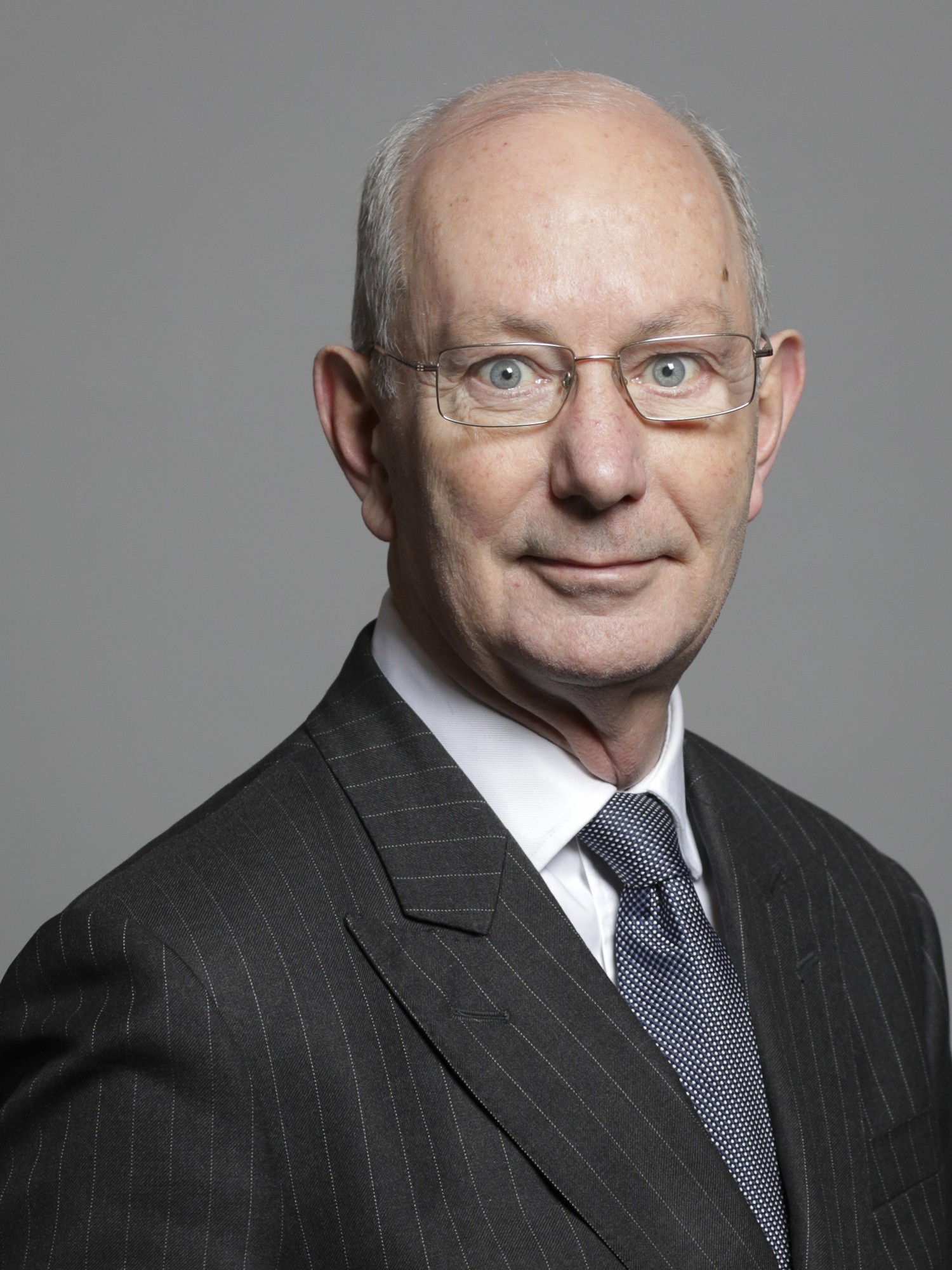
- Official portrait, 2020

Member of the House of Lords
- Lord Temporal
- Life peerage 2 October 1997

Director of the Number 10 Policy Unit
- In office 5 July 1995 – 2 May 1997
- Prime Minister: John Major
- Preceded by: Sarah Hogg
- Succeeded by: David Miliband

Personal details
- Born: Norman Roy Blackwell; 29 July 1952 (age 74)
- Party: Conservative
- Spouse: Brenda Clucas (m. 1974)
- Children: 5
- Education: University of Cambridge; University of Pennsylvania
- Occupation: Banker; politician

Norman Roy Blackwell, Baron Blackwell (born 29 July 1952) is a British former businessman, civil servant, Conservative politician, campaigner and policy advisor.

== Early life ==
The son of Albert and Frances Blackwell, he was educated first at Latymer Upper School, and as a Junior Exhibitioner at The Royal Academy of Music in London. He graduated from Trinity College, Cambridge with a master of arts in natural sciences in 1973. He then obtained a Thouron Award to study at the Wharton School at the University of Pennsylvania where he graduated with a master of business administration in 1975, and then in 1976 with a doctor of philosophy in finance and economics.

== Career ==
=== Business and commerce employment ===
Upon leaving academia Norman commenced employment in 1976 with The Plessey Company, a British-based international electronics, defence and telecommunications company, where he was involved with strategic planning. In 1978 he moved to McKinsey & Company, a global management consulting and from where, in 1986, he was seconded to work, until 1987, for the Conservative government of the United Kingdom. Back at McKinsey's, Blackwell was made a partner in 1984 and he remained with the firm until 1995, when a second spell working for a British Conservative Government commenced. That administration's defeat in the 1997 general election saw him again take up private sector employment with National Westminster Bank as director of group development between 1997 and 2000. The new millennium witnessed a change in employment opportunities and he began a new phase in his career as a non-executive director and advisor appointed to a number of public listed companies.

==== Current directorships ====
Non-executive director, Lloyds Banking Group plc and at Lloyds Bank Plc since 1 June 2012 and chairman from April 2014. He was appointed chairman of both Scottish Widows Group Ltd (insurance subsidiary of Lloyds Banking Group plc) and Scottish Widows plc on 1 September 2012, but stepped down on becoming chairman of parent company Lloyds Banking Group on 3 April 2014.

===== Emoluments – business and commerce employment =====
Lord Blackwell received remuneration of £755,000 as Chairman of Lloyds Banking Group, as detailed in the 2018 annual report. He had no other remunerated employment.

==== Past directorship and advisor roles ====
Chairman, Interserve plc, a global support services group since 1 January 2006, having initially joined the board in September 2005. After nine years as Interserve chairman, Lord Blackwell stepped down in early 2016 and was replaced by Glyn Barker.

Non-executive director, Halma plc, which provides specialist technologies for safety, health and environmental protection) since 29 July 2010. He stepped down in 2014, and was replaced by Paul Walker.

Blackwell was a special advisor to KPMG, within its corporate finance division, between 2000 and 2008 his role was reported by the Financial News as being "to assist the firm in the development of its corporate finance business with big corporates".

He became non-executive chairman of Akers Biosciences Inc on 8 May 2002, ahead of its stock market listing on the AIM market of the London Stock Exchange on 22 May 2002, yet resigned from the board on 28 March 2003, little more than 10 months later.

He served as senior independent non-executive director at Corporate Services Group Plc, a recruitment and employment agency, from December 2000 to 9 June 2006. and as a non-executive director of Dixons Group, a consumer electronics retailer, from 2000 to 2003 He was appointed non-executive director at SEGRO Plc, a property investment and development company which later became a real estate investment trust (REIT), from 1 April 2001 to 29 April 2010 and was senior independent director from 2005 Blackwell became non-executive chairman of Smartstream Technologies Ltd, a financial transaction management business, in 2001 a position he held until 2005 He served as a non-executive director of Standard Life Plc from 6 June 2003 to 25 May 2012. and as senior independent director from 2008 until May 2012.

== Government and politics ==
From 1986 to 1987 Norman Blackwell was a member of Margaret Thatcher's Prime Minister's Policy Unit. He then returned to 10 Downing Street serving as head of the Prime Minister's Policy Unit under the government of John Major from 1995 to 1997, where he coordinated domestic policy development across government departments.

=== Peerage ===
On 2 October 1997, he was created a life peer as Baron Blackwell, of Woodcote in the County of Surrey. The honour was bestowed upon him as part of the 1997 Prime Minister's Resignation Honours which marked the May 1997 resignation of Prime Minister John Major, following the Conservative party's defeat in the 1997 general election. He sits in the House of Lords as a lord temporal for the Conservatives.

==== Parliamentary committees ====
As of 4 April 2013 the United Kingdom Parliament listed Lord Blackwell's participation in the following committees:

| Committee | House | Years served |
|---|---|---|
| Tax Law Rewrite Bills (Joint Committee) | Lords | 2002–2010 |
| EU Sub-Committee A – Economic and Financial Affairs, and International Trade | Lords | 2003–2007 |
| European Union Committee | Lords | 2004–2008 |
| EU Sub-Committee E – Justice and Institutions | Lords | 2007–2012 |
| Delegated Powers and Regulatory Reform Committee | Lords | 2008–2013 |
| Secondary Legislation Scrutiny Committee | Lords | 2013-2014 |

=== Public policy think tank ===
In 1983 Blackwell co-authored a pamphlet for the Bow Group the oldest conservative think tank in the United Kingdom. From 2000 to 2012, he was a non-executive board member of the British centre-right policy think tank the Centre for Policy Studies (CPS), whose goal is to promote coherent and practical public policy, to roll back the state, reform public services, support communities, and challenge threats to Britain's independence. Although identified as non-partisan, the centre has strong historical links to the Conservative Party. He served as chairman of the CPS between 2000 and 2009.

=== Campaign group ===
The campaign group Global Vision was launched in March 2007 by Lord Blackwell and Ruth Lea. It purported to be "completely independent and non-partisan." Its website gives its aims as being; "to create a campaign which would offer a refreshing, forward and outward looking alternative to the existing polarised choices of going along with the full European project or pulling out and breaking all ties with our European neighbours. By advocating this middle way, Global Vision promotes a constructive new relationship between the UK and Europe based on free trade and mutually beneficial cooperation, whilst opting out of the process of political and economic integration."

Lord Blackwell published the research paper, "A Blueprint for Renegotiating The UK's EU Relationship" for the campaign. The paper sets out an agenda to safeguard UK powers or, repatriate EU powers in the following areas: foreign and defence policy, legal and judicial, legislative and regulatory, European Court of Justice, EU programmes, trade policy, and free market, so as to create a new relationship between Britain and the EU.

== Public service ==
=== Current ministerial appointment ===
==== Office of Communications ====
Norman Blackwell was appointed a non-executive board member for The Office of Communications commonly known as Ofcom, initially for a three-year term, from 1 September 2009. He was subsequently reappointed to serve a second three-year term but stepped down in 2014.

Ofcom is the government-approved regulatory and competition authority for the broadcasting, telecommunications and postal industries of the United Kingdom. He was a member of the Ofcom Content Board, Nominations Committee and Remuneration Committee. He had special non-executive responsibility for postal regulation.

===== Emoluments – public service appointments =====
Lord Blackwell received the following emoluments for his public service role in 2010:

| Regulatory Body | Office | Remuneration (£’s) |
|---|---|---|
| Ofcom^{[a]} | Non-Executive board member | 42,519 |

[a] for 1–2 days per week

=== Past ministerial appointments ===
==== Office of Fair Trading ====
Norman Blackwell served as a non-executive board member for the Office of Fair Trading (OFT) from 1 April 2003 initially for a five-year term, that was subsequently extended upon expiry for a further two years, up to 31 March 2010.

The OFT is a non-ministerial government department of the United Kingdom, which enforces both consumer protection and competition law, acting as the UK's economic regulator. The OFT's goal is to make markets work well for consumers, ensuring vigorous competition between fair-dealing businesses and prohibiting unfair practices such as rogue trading, scams and cartels.

During the period when Lord Blackwell served as a non-executive director of the OFT a company where, at the time, he was also chairman, Interserve plc, became subject to an investigation by the OFT into tender activity in the construction industry prior to him joining the Interserve Board. The investigation was described by the OFT as "one of the largest ever Competition Act investigations". Interserve were found to have engaged in illegal anti-competitive bid rigging activities and were fined a sum of £11,634,750.

==== Postal Services Commission ====
Lord Blackwell served as a commissioner of Postcomm, the Postal Services Commission a non-ministerial department of the government of the United Kingdom charged with overseeing the quality and universal service of post in the United Kingdom. Postcomm was merged into the communications regulator Ofcom on 1 October 2011.

== Personal life ==
He married Brenda Clucas; they have three sons and two daughters. Blackwell owns properties in London and Surrey let on assured short hold tenancies, owned jointly with his wife. Blackwell's recreations, as listed in Debretts People of Today, are: classical music, walking, gardening. He is a Trustee of the Royal Academy of Music.

== Arms ==
Coat of arms of Norman Blackwell, Baron Blackwell
| Crest A badger sejant erect Proper gorged with a plain collar Or and holding in the dexter forepaw a rose Gules barbed seeded slipped and leaved Or. Escutcheon Sable between two chevronels Argent five garbs Or. Supporters On either side a beaver sejant erect Gules the tail Or holding in the interior paw and holding a trumpet also Or. Motto Endeavour And Integrity |

== Publications ==
Lord Blackwell has published the following public policy pamphlets:

- Blackwell, Norman Roy. (2011). Look Back from the Future : A radical path to growth and prosperity in the 21st century (PDF). London: Centre for Policy Studies. ISBN 978-1-906996-39-0. Archived from the original (PDF) on 28 December 2020.
- Blackwell, Norman Roy. (2009). A Blueprint for Renegotiating The UK's EU Relationship (PDF). London: Global Vision Research Paper.
- Blackwell, Norman Roy. (2006). Three Cheers for Selection : How grammar schools help the poor. London: Centre for Policy Studies. ISBN 1905389418.
- Blackwell, Norman Roy. (2006). From Principle to Policy: What an alternative manifesto should say. (with Ruth Lea). London: Centre for Policy Studies. ISBN 190538937X.
- Blackwell, Norman Roy. (2006). Sleepwalking into an EU Legal System: How the Charter of Fundamental Rights is Being Incorporated Into British Law. London: Centre for Policy Studies. ISBN 1905389248.
- Blackwell, Norman Roy. (2005). Take poor families out of tax!. London: Centre for Policy Studies. ISBN 1905389140.
- Blackwell, Norman Roy. (2004). Why Britain Can't Afford Not to Cut Taxes: Five Tax Cuts to Make Now. London: Centre for Policy Studies. ISBN 1903219817.
- Blackwell, Norman Roy. (2004). Better Schools and Hospitals : Why parent and patient choice will work. London: Centre for Policy Studies. ISBN 1903219752.
- Blackwell, Norman Roy. (2004). What if we say no to the EU Constitution?. London: Centre for Policy Studies. ISBN 190321971X.
- Blackwell, Norman Roy. (2003). Freedom and Responsibility: a manifesto for a smaller state, a bolder nation. London: Centre for Policy Studies. ISBN 1903219590.
- Blackwell, Norman Roy. (2003). A Defining Moment? A review of the issues and options for Britain arising from the Convention on the Future of Europe. London: Centre for Policy Studies. ISBN 1903219531.
- Blackwell, Norman Roy. (2002). Better Healthcare for All : Replacing the NHS monopoly with patient choice. (with Daniel Kruger). London: Centre for Policy Studies. ISBN 1903219434.
- Blackwell, Norman Roy. (2001). Funding the Basic State Pension : Report of the Independent Panel on Pension Reform. Chairman: Lord Blackwell. London: Centre for Policy Studies. ISBN 1903219264.
- Blackwell, Norman Roy. (2001). Towards Smaller Government: the second wave of the revolution. London: Centre for Policy Studies. ISBN 1903219302.
- Blackwell, Norman Roy. (1983). Beyond Minis: Improving Public Sector Efficiency and Effectiveness : the Next Steps. (with Tim Eggar). London: Bow Group.

Orders of precedence in the United Kingdom
| Preceded by The Lord Lang of Monkton | Gentlemen; Baron Blackwell | Followed by The Lord Sainsbury of Turville |
