= Horgan =

Horgan is a surname of Irish origin. The origins of the name lie in County Cork, Ireland;

Notable people with the surname include:

- Aisleyne Horgan-Wallace (born 1978), British model
- Anthony Horgan (born 1976), Irish rugby footballer
- Brendan Horgan, American businessman
- Cara Horgan (born before 2004), English actress
- Denis Horgan (1871–1922), Irish athlete
- Goretti Horgan (born 1950s), Irish socialist activist
- Joe Horgan (born 1977), American baseball player
- John Horgan (disambiguation), several people
- Mary Horgan, Irish physician
- Michael Horgan (cyclist) (1934–2023), Irish cyclist
- Michael C. Horgan (1846–1910), American Union Navy sailor
- Neal Horgan (born 1979), Irish footballer
- Ollie Horgan (1968–2025), Irish football manager
- P. H. Horgan III (born 1960), American golfer
- Pat Horgan (born 1957), Irish hurler
- Patrick Horgan (born 1987), Irish hurler
- Paul Horgan (1903–1995), American author
- Richard Cornelius Horgan (1867–1942), musical theatre librettist (as Austen Hurgon)
- Robbie Horgan (born 1968), Irish footballer
- Séamus Horgan (born 1946), Irish hurler
- Shane Horgan (born 1978), Irish rugby footballer
- Sharon Horgan (born 1970), Irish writer
- Siobhan Horgan (born 1978), Irish racing cyclist
- Stephen H. Horgan (1854–1941), American inventor
- Thomas Horgan (born 1953), American politician from Nebraska and higher education administrator
- Tracy Horgan (born 1986), Canadian curler
