= David Chandler Thomas =

American economist (1954–2021)

- Born: July 27, 1954; Phoenix, Arizona, US
- Died: December 28, 2021 (aged 67); Indianapolis, Indiana

Academic background
- Influences: Chicago School; Milton Friedman; F.A. Hayek

Academic work
- Discipline: Health economics
- School or tradition: Neoclassical economics

David Chandler Thomas (1954–2021) was an American economist and technology executive. He taught at Ball State University, where he researched public health and business cycles, and served on the advisory board of the College of Health and Human Services at George Mason University.

== Business and Corporate Experience ==
=== CYMA ===
Thomas created CYMA Software, one of the earliest PC accounting software companies, which he sold to McGraw-Hill in 1984.

=== Intacct Corporation ===
In 1999 Thomas, along with co-founder Odysseas Tsatalos, launched Intacct Corporation, which was acquired by Sage Group in 2017 in a deal purported to be 850 million dollars.

=== Industry Associations ===
Thomas transitioned to the public sector in 2004, serving as the executive director for the Software and Information Industry Association through 2009 and then as Executive Vice President of TechAmerica in Washington, DC.

== Education and personal life ==
Thomas was born in 1954 in Phoenix, Arizona.

He graduated from San Jose State University with a Bachelor of Arts degree in economics in 2010 and received his PhD in economics from George Mason University in 2015 with his dissertation titled Empirical Studies of Emergency Response Services (9-1-1) and an Examination of Moral Hazard in Health Insurance. At George Mason, he was mentored by econometrician Thomas Stratmann. He was married to Gayle Bradshaw Thomas.
