= Berruyer =

Berruyer is a surname. Notable people with the surname include:

- Guy Berruyer (born 1951), French businessman
- Isaac-Joseph Berruyer (1681–1758), French Jesuit historian
- Jean-François Berruyer (1741–1804), French general
- Philip Berruyer (died 1260), French archbishop
