= Mass concentration =

Mass concentration or mascon may refer to:

- Mass concentration (chemistry), the mass of a constituent divided by the volume of a mixture
- Mass concentration (astronomy), a region of a planet or moon's crust that contains a large positive gravity anomaly
