= Louise Makin =

British businesswoman (born 1960)

Dame Louise Makin DBE
- Born: Pamela Louise Makin; 27 November 1960 (age 65)
- Education: University of Cambridge
- Children: 2

Dame Pamela Louise Makin DBE (born 27 November 1960) is a British business executive.

== Early life ==
Makin was born on 27 November 1960. She attended The Queen's School, Chester and King Edward VI High School for Girls before going on to receive an masters in Natural Sciences and a PhD in Metallurgy, both from the University of Cambridge (Newnham College and St John's College), and an MBA.

== Career ==
Makin was the chief executive of BTG PLC from 17 September 2004 to 2019. She served as the president for biopharmaceuticals Europe at Baxter Healthcare since 2001, where she was responsible for sales in Europe, Africa and the Middle East. Makin joined Baxter Healthcare in 2000 as vice president of strategy and business development Europe.

Before joining Baxter, she was a director for global ceramics of English China Clay and prior to that she held a variety of roles at ICI between 1985 and 1998.

She has been a non-executive director of Intertek Group plc since 1 July 2012, a non-executive director of the Woodford Patient Capital Trust, a trustee of the Outward Bound Trust, and chair of the 1851 Trust. She was previously a non-executive director at Premier Foods from October 2006 to September 2012.

Makin succeeded Paul Walker as chair of the FTSE 100 company Halma plc in July 2021. She stepped down from the board of Intertek a month earlier, in June.

== Honours ==
In the 2014 Birthday Honours, she was made a Dame Commander of the Order of the British Empire.

She is an honorary fellow of St. John’s College, Cambridge.

== Personal life ==
Makin has two daughters with her partner, Chris, who works in the IT industry.
