= Paul Milford Muller =

American aerospace engineer and author

- Born: September 30, 1937; Los Angeles, California, US
- Died: May 28, 2013 (aged 75) (death announced on this date); Tak Province, Thailand
- Occupations: Author; Businessman; Aerospace engineering
- Known for: Sage Group
- Awards: Magellanic Premium; FRAS

Paul Milford Muller FRAS (1937–2013) was an American aerospace engineer, fiction author, and the co-founder of Sage Group, the United Kingdom's largest software business.

== Early life and education ==
Muller was born on September 30, 1937, in Los Angeles, California. Muller studied mathematics and history at California State University and later was awarded a PhD in physics: astronomy & planetary science by Newcastle University in 1975. This PhD work was published as a book, An analysis of the ancient astronomical observations with the implications for geophysics and cosmology. In 1963 Muller became a high school teacher of Mathematics in California.

== Scientific career ==
Muller worked for NASA at the Jet Propulsion Laboratory between 1966 and 1977 and was as a senior member of the Apollo navigation team. In 1971 Muller was awarded the Magellanic Premium award along with William L. Sjogren the for their discovery of mass concentrations in the moon's ringed basins. In 1970 Muller was made a Fellow of the Royal Astronomical Society, proposed by Harold Urey.

== Later career ==
In the early 1980s, Muller co-founded the business software company Sage Group along with David Goldman and Graham Wylie in Newcastle upon Tyne, England while he was a computer science lecturer at Newcastle University. Muller left Sage in late 1985 following a dispute with fellow shareholders and took legal action against them and the company in the following years. After leaving Sage Muller returned to the United States.

In later life Muller lived in Mae Sot, Thailand and became an author of fiction novels having three books published by Club Lighthouse in 2012; Suicide Inc., Flight of the Marbles and The Circle of Ouroboros. He also co-founded the Aarau Literary Agency in 2001.

== Death ==
Muller was found dead inside a house in Tak Province, Thailand in late May 2013, aged 75.
