= Cyma =

Cyma may refer to either:

- An S-shaped decorative molding, used in the cymatium of Greek architecture
- CYMA – Canadian Youth Mission to Armenia, a Canadian-run humanitarian program
- CYMA (software), accounting packages
- Cyma Watches, a Swiss watch-making company
- Cyma Zarghami, the president of Nickelodeon and MTV Networks' Kids & Family Group
- The ICAO code for Mayo Airport
