= Stephen Kelly (businessman) =

British businessman (born 1961)

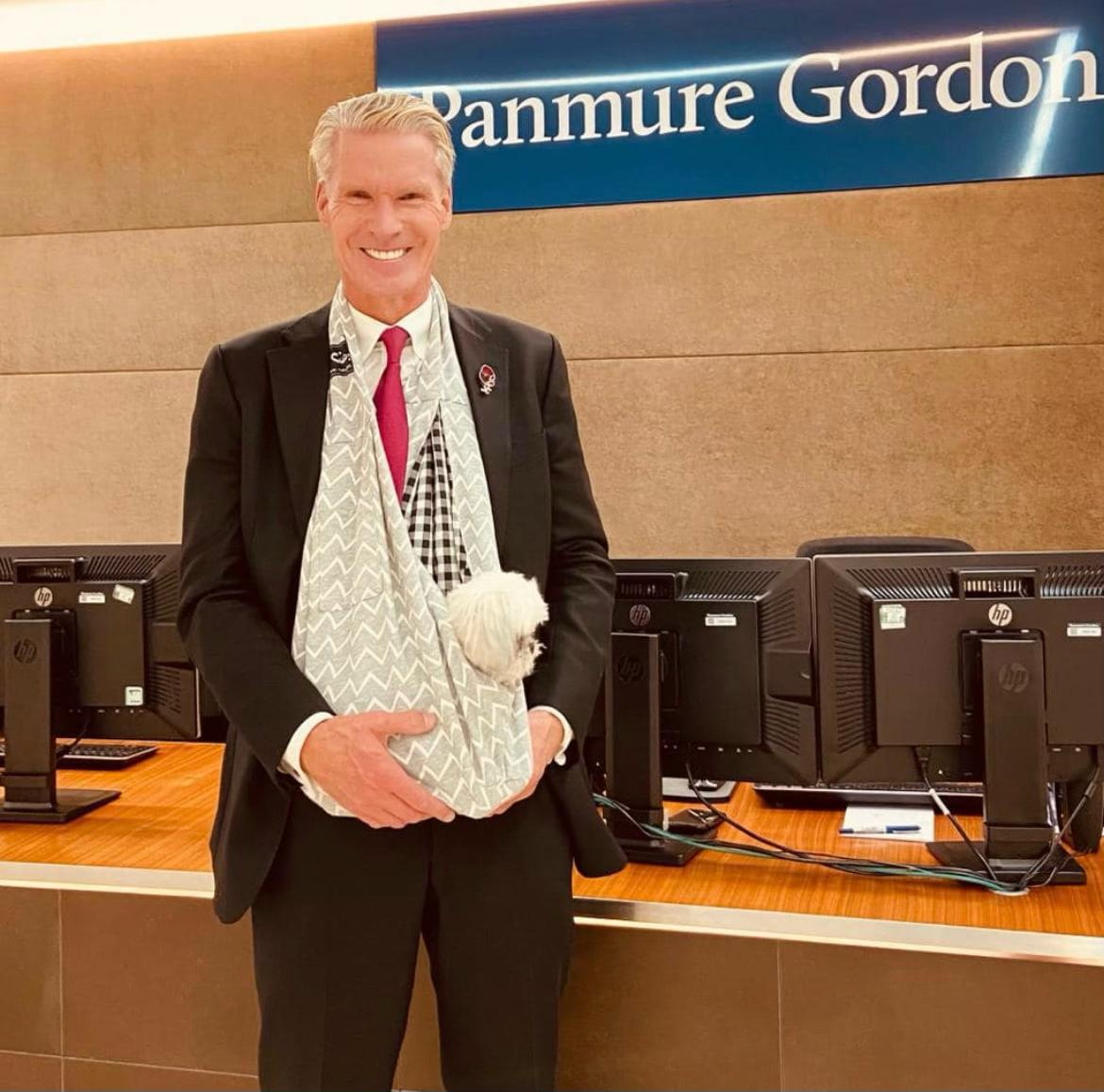
- Stephen Kelly at Panmure Gordon
- Born: 30 December 1961 (age 64); Kent, United Kingdom
- Occupation: British businessman
- Spouse: Siobhan Kelly
- Children: 3

Stephen Paul Kelly (born 30 December 1961) is a British businessman who has served as Chief Executive Officer of Cirata (since 2023).

== Early life ==
He was born in Kent, England and attended the Harvey Grammar School in Folkestone. Kelly received a BSc in Business Administration from the University of Bath. He went on to receive an honorary doctorate in Business Administration in 2016.

== Career ==
Kelly has 40 years' of leadership experience in both the private and public sectors. He is currently CEO of Cirata and previously has held three CEO positions with UK & US public tech companies, as well as spending three years as the first Chief Operating Officer of the UK Government.

He started his career in Technical Support, working for the now-defunct British tech firm, ICL, for four years. In 1988, he joined American multinational computer technology corporation, Oracle as an executive of the European management team. After nine years at Oracle, he joined Californian enterprise software company Chordiant, becoming chief executive officer in 2001. In 2007, following an internal audit of its historical stock option granting practices, Chordiant restated its financial statements and recorded an $8.3 million non-cash charge to correct measurement dates on executive stock options granted between 2000 and 2005. The restatement followed an SEC investigation into industry-wide backdating and resulted in a consolidated shareholder derivative lawsuit, Jesse Brown v. Stephen Kelly. The litigation was settled with executives agreeing to surrender or repay the excess value on over 750,000 backdated options.

He returned to the UK in 2006 to become chief executive officer of FTSE software firm Micro Focus International. In 2009, he announced he would step down as CEO of Micro Focus. Micro Focus was one of the FTSE250 best-performing stocks during his tenure, rising seven-fold.

In 2011 he joined the UK Government, and was made its first Chief Operating Officer and head of the Efficiency and Reform Group in 2012 under cabinet office minister, Francis Maude. During his tenure, the Efficiency & Reform group reported annual savings, though the National Audit Office noted significant differences in methodology across the reported figures. Kelly joined the Cabinet Office Board amongst many Government Board roles and chaired the Government's Senior Information, Security & Risk Board.

He left his role with the Government in November 2014 to join FTSE 100 multinational enterprise software company, Sage Group, where he was Sage's first externally appointed CEO. During his time as CEO, the firm acquired North American cloud-based financial software company Intacct in 2017 for $850m, and Fairsail, a British provider of cloud-based human resources software. As part of the compassionate capitalism & social purpose mission, Kelly started the Sage Foundation, donating annually 75,000 days of volunteering time, technology & millions of pounds to philanthropic and charitable causes. Notable successes include dramatically reducing youth homelessness in Newcastle and positively impacting domestic violence in South Africa. Kelly co-chaired the Anglo-Brazil Trade Board (JETCO).

In 2015, Kelly was appointed as one of six new Prime Minister's business ambassadors to help boost the UK's performance in international trade.

On 31 August 2018, Kelly stepped down as a director and CEO of Sage following a period of declining performance, including a major profit warning and lowered organic growth targets earlier in the year that resulted in a sharp drop in the company's share price."Sage chief Stephen Kelly steps down". Financial Times. 31 August 2018."Sage CEO Stephen Kelly steps down". Reuters. 31 August 2018. He was succeeded by Steve Hare, the company's CFO.

In 2019, Kelly was voted “Mentor of the Year” at UK Enterprise Awards.

On 1 June 2020, Kelly was appointed as Chair of Tech Nation, the growth platform for tech companies and leaders, joining existing board members including Tech Nation CEO Gerard Grech, David James Richards, founder and former CEO of WANdisco, and Sarah Wood, co-founder of Unruly and Jo Johnson, Lesley Eccles & Eric Collins.

On 9 May 2023, Kelly was appointed Interim CEO at Wandisco, which later seen his title change to permanent CEO after the shares resumed listing on the LSE.

Kelly is an angel investor & mentor in many sustainability and women-led businesses as well as Chair of The Algorithm People, and advisor to BlackRock and Locums Nest.

He was appointed Chair of the Science & Technology Honours Committee in December 2021 and now sits on the main Honours Committee. He was appointed a member of the No. 10 Innovation Fellowship Board in 2021.

== Personal life ==
He is married with three daughters.
