= Steve Hare (businessman) =

British businessman (born 1961)

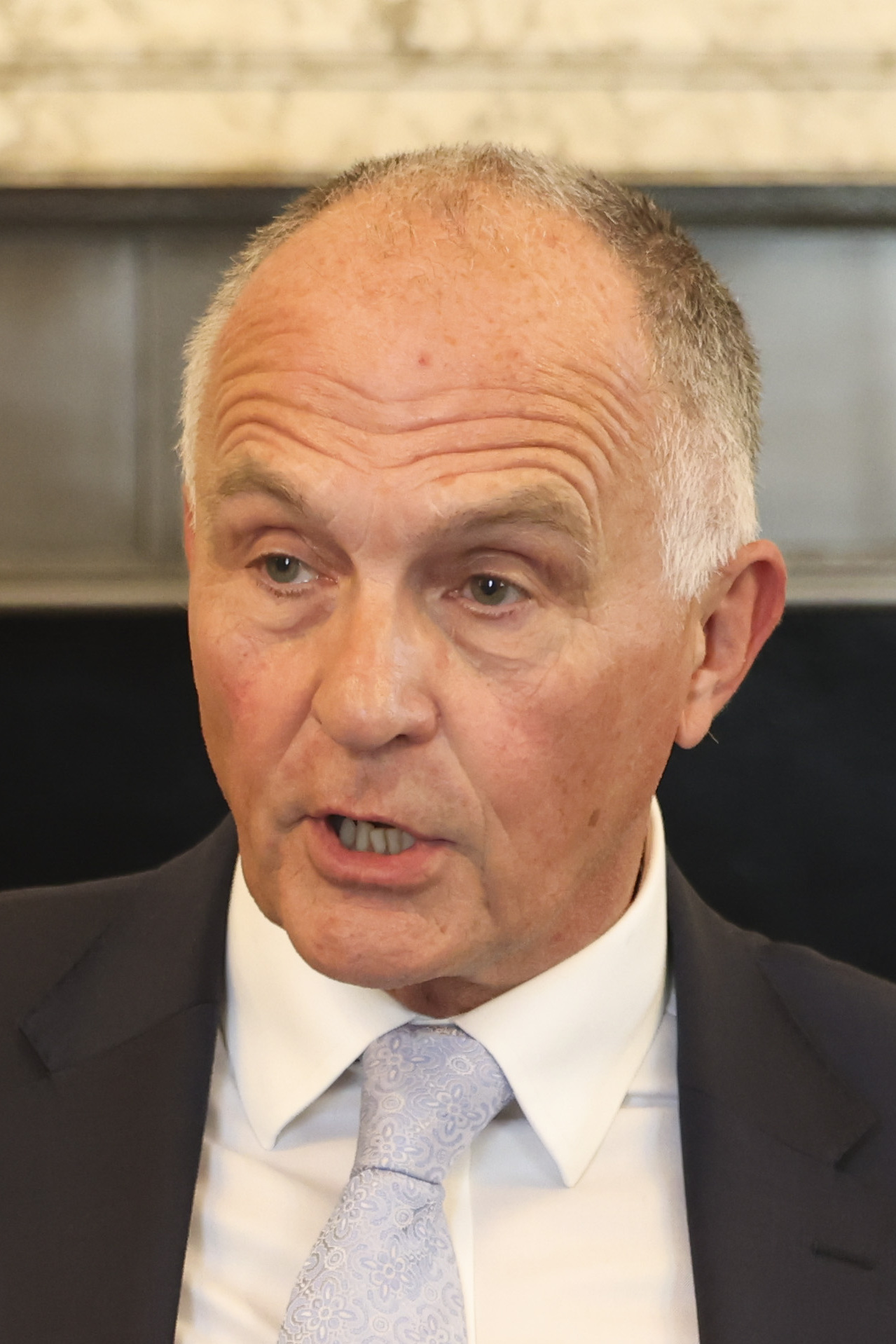
- Hare in 2023
- Born: April 15, 1961 (age 65); Withernsea, East Riding of Yorkshire, UK
- Occupation: Businessman
- Known for: CEO of Sage Group

Stephen Hare (born 15 April 1961) is a British businessman and the chief executive of the multinational enterprise software company Sage Group.

== Early life ==
Hare was born in Withernsea, East Riding of Yorkshire, in 1961, and when he was six the family moved to Hong Kong. When he was 11, they returned to the UK and Hare attended Pocklington School, a Yorkshire boarding school. Hare then studied economics and accountancy at Liverpool University, and afterwards he joined the auditing firm Ernst & Young.

== Career ==
Hare joined General Electric Company in 1989 and had a number of roles eventually becoming chief financial officer (CFO) of its successor, Marconi plc. After leaving Marconi, Hare took up CFO roles at Spectris plc from 2005 to 2006 and Invensys from 2006 to 2009. Hare then became a partner at Apax Partners from 2009 to 2013.

In 2014 Hare joined Sage Group as CFO. During his time as CFO, Sage made its biggest acquisition, Intacct, in July 2017 for $850 million.

On 31 August 2018, Sage announced that the board and the then current Sage CEO, Stephen Kelly, had come to an agreement and that Kelly had stepped down as a director and CEO. Immediately following Kelly's departure Hare was appointed chief operating officer on an interim basis. On 2 November 2018 Steve Hare was appointed CEO on a full-time basis.

In a 2020 poll Glassdoor named Hare the UK's number 1 CEO during the COVID-19 pandemic. On 3 April 2025, Sainsbury's announced that they were appointing Hare to their board as a non-executive director from 3 July.

== Personal life ==
Hare lives near York, England. He is married, with four children.
