= David Goldman (businessman) =

- Born: Alan David Goldman; 27 February 1937; Sunderland, England
- Died: 26 October 1999 (aged 62)
- Occupation: Businessman
- Known for: Co-founder of Sage Group
- Spouse: Cynthia
- Children: 2

Alan David Goldman MBE (27 February 1937 – 26 October 1999) was a co-founder of the Sage Group, the United Kingdom's largest software business.

== Career ==
Born in Sunderland on 27 February 1937, David Goldman trained as an accountant before moving into sales and marketing: then for 20 years he managed a small printing business known as Campbell Graphics. In 1981 together with Graham Wylie, an undergraduate at Newcastle University, and Paul Muller, an American consultant, he established Sage to market a financial accounting system for small businesses. In 1984, Sage launched an accounts software package for the new Amstrad PCW computer. This led to a major expansion of the business.

David Goldman was appointed a Member of the Order of the British Empire in 1992. In 1993 Goldman was awarded an Honorary Doctorate of Business Administration (DBA) from Sunderland University.

Goldman retired as Sage chief executive in 1994 and as chairman in 1997. Goldman was appointed non-executive chairman of BATM Advanced Communications in 1996.

Goldman was a significant Labour Party donor in the 1997 United Kingdom general election.

== Death ==
Goldman died on 26 October 1999 after a long illness. A number of endowments to North East institutions were made in Goldman's name including to Newcastle University Business School, Sunderland University and the Sage Gateshead. Goldman was survived by his wife Cynthia and two sons – Andrew and Daniel.
