= Guy Berruyer =

French businessman

Guy Serge Berruyer (born 12 August 1951) is a French businessman, former chief executive (CEO) of Sage Group plc, a British multinational enterprise software company.

== Early life ==
Born in 1951, Berruyer's university education was at the École Polytechnique Fédérale de Lausanne, where he trained as an engineer. He also holds an MBA from Harvard University.

== Career at Sage ==
Berruyer joined Sage Group in 1997 to run its French operations. He took over the position from Pierre-Yves Morlet, who was the founder of Ciel, the French software business that Sage acquired in 1992.

Previously he held the position of Country Manager and then European Director for the US software company Intuit. Prior employment included the French software company Groupe Bull where he was director of marketing until 1990 and Claris, where he created the French division and grew into the role of European manager until 1994. He was appointed to the Board of Directors of Sage in January 2000. He had responsibility for Mainland European operators and operations in Asia.

Mainland Europe represented the circa 70% of Sage's European revenues in the year to September 2009 and circa 60% of its profits. Europe was the largest region in terms of sales and profitability for Sage in 2009, generating £763 million of revenues and an EBITA profit of £192 million. This compares with the North American divisions revenues of £576 million and EBITA profit of £105 million with the rest of the world generating revenues of £100 million and EBITA profit of £24 million.

On 1 October 2010 Berruyer succeeded Paul Walker as CEO of Sage Group. In May 2014, Sage announced that Berruyer was to retire; Stephen Kelly became Sage Group CEO in November 2014.

== Career after Sage ==
In 2019, he became chairman at Softomotive, a provider of Robotic Process Automation solutions.
