= Geoff Drabble =

British businessman

- Born: Geoffrey Drabble; December 1959 (age 66)
- Education: Aberystwyth University
- Occupation: Businessman
- Title: Former CEO, Ashtead Group
- Term: January 2007-May 2019
- Successor: Brendan Horgan
- Spouse: Married

Geoffrey Drabble (born December 1959) is a British businessman, and was the CEO of Ashtead Group, an industrial equipment rental company and FTSE 100 Index constituent, from January 2007 to May 2019.

== Early life ==
He has a bachelor's degree in economics and accountancy from Aberystwyth University.

== Career ==
Drabble started his career with Black & Decker, then Laird, before joining Ashtead.

Drabble has seen Ashtead's share price rise from £1.50 to £15.50 over his nearly 11 years as CEO.

In 2018, he was named "CEO of the Year" at the PLC Awards.

In November 2018, it was announced that Drabble would retire as CEO of Ashtead Group on 1 May 2019, and would be succeeded by Brendan Horgan, the Group COO and chief executive of Sunbelt Rentals, Ashtead's North American business.

== Personal life ==
He met his future wife while at university.
