= Global Vision (UK) =

- Established: March 2007 (19 years ago)
- Founders: Ruth Lea, Baroness Lea of Lymm, Norman Blackwell
- Types: advocacy group
- Headquarters: 55 Tufton Street
- Location: 55 Tufton Street
- Country: United Kingdom
- Website: www.global-vision.net

Global Vision is a British eurosceptic campaign group. It is an independent, not-for-profit group, with no explicit links with any political party. The "Parliamentary Friends of Global Vision" cross-party group has 24 Members of Parliament, all of whom are Conservatives, two Members of the European Parliament, both of whom are Conservatives, and 17 Representative peers, of whom ten are Conservative, six are cross-benchers, and one is independent Labour.

The group was started by Ruth Lea and Lord Blackwell, and was launched publicly in March 2007. The group's premise is economic, reflecting the backgrounds of Ruth Lea and Lord Blackwell. They say that the regulatory burden of the EU holds the City of London back from its potential and has a detrimental effect on business. They argue that Britain should leave the EU and negotiate a trading agreement with it - a similar relationship to that of Switzerland.
