= John Horgan (disambiguation) =

John Horgan (1959–2024) was a Canadian politician and premier of British Columbia.

John Horgan may also refer to:

== Politicians ==
- John Horgan (Australian politician) (1834–1907), Australian politician, Western Australia MLC
- John Horgan (Irish politician) (1876–1955), Irish politician
- John Horgan (Irish nationalist) (1881–1967), Irish Cork-born nationalist politician, solicitor and author

== Sportspeople ==
- John Horgan (hurler) (1950–2016), Irish sportsperson
- John G. Horgan (1866–1921), pocket billiards (pool) player

== Others ==
- John Horgan (academic) (born 1940), Irish press ombudsman, former journalist, politician and professor
- John Horgan (journalist) (born 1953), American science journalist
- John Horgan (psychologist) (born 1974), Irish political psychologist, terrorism researcher, and professor
- John Horgan, chairman of the Western Australian Development Corporation
