= Sunbelt Rentals =

British industrial equipment rental company

Sunbelt Rentals Holdings, Inc.

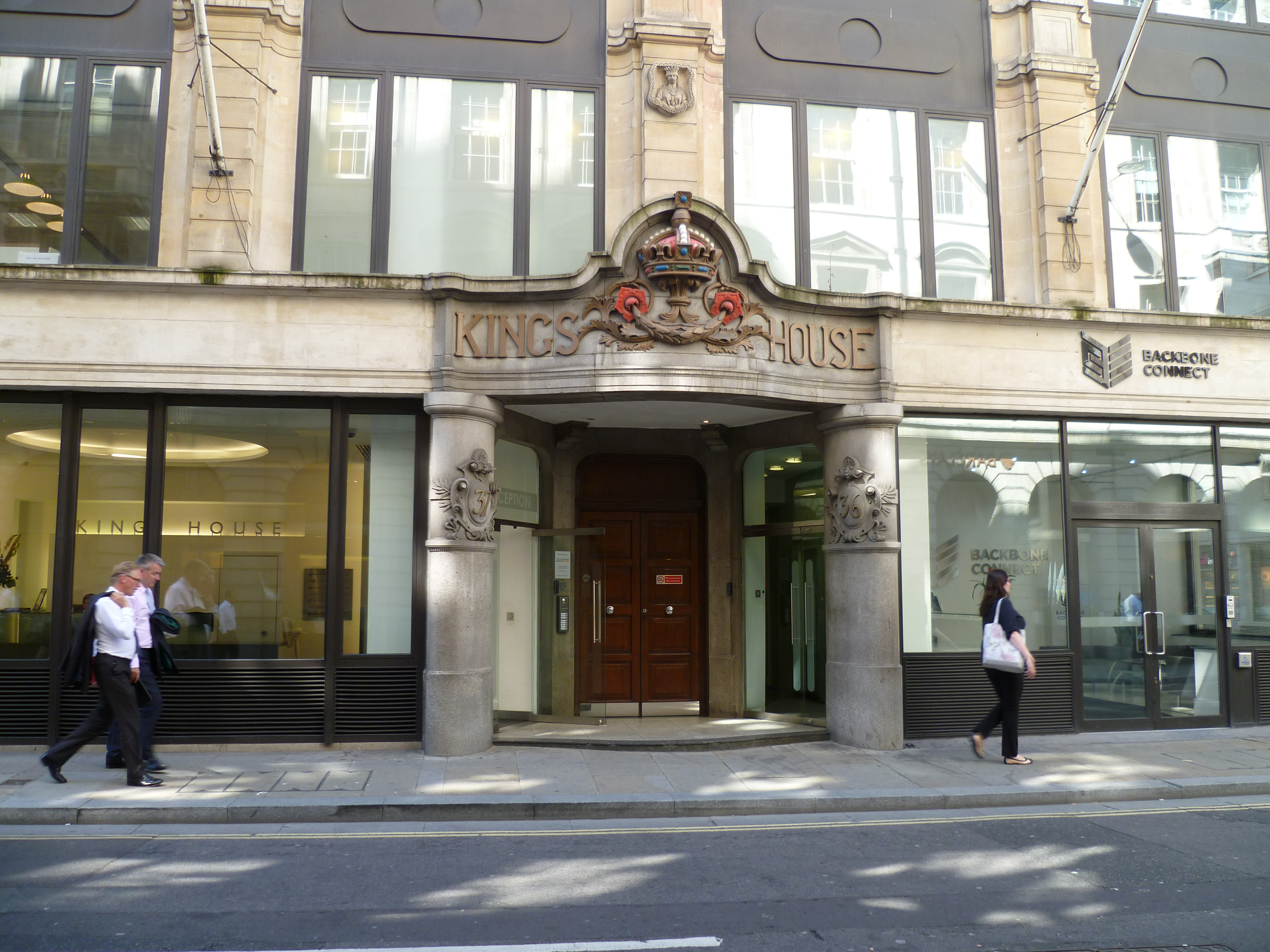
- The company offices at King's House in London
- Formerly: Needroy Limited (1984–1986); Ashtead Group plc (1986–2026)
- Type: Public
- Traded as: NYSE: SUNB; Russell 1000 component
- ISIN: GB0000536739
- Industry: Plant hire
- Founded: 1947; 79 years ago
- Headquarters: London, England, UK; South Carolina, United States (operational)
- Key people: Paul Walker (Chairperson); Brendan Horgan (CEO)
- Revenue: ▲£9,980.4 million (2025)
- Operating income: ▼£2,557.2 million (2025)
- Net income: ▼£1,510.5 million (2025)
- Number of employees: 25,344 (2025)
- Website: ir.sunbeltrentals.com

Sunbelt Rentals Holdings, Inc. is an American-British industrial equipment rental company based in London, England and South Carolina, United States. Domiciled in Delaware, it was listed on the London Stock Exchange and was a constituent of the FTSE 100 Index until it transferred its listing to the US in February 2026.

== History ==
The company was founded in 1947, in the village of Ashtead, Surrey, as Ashtead Plant and Tool Hire. It was first listed on the London Stock Exchange in 1986 and acquired an American plant hire business, Sunbelt Rentals, in 1990.

In September 2018, the company appointed Paul Walker as non-executive chairman of its board.

In November 2018, it was announced that Geoff Drabble would retire as CEO after twelve years on 1 May 2019, and would be succeeded by Brendan Horgan, the Group Chief Operations Officer and chief executive of the company's North American business.

In June 2022, the company's main operating subsidiary, was announced as an investor in lithium-ion battery developer Britishvolt. After Britishvolt went into administration in January 2023, the company took a £35m hit from its collapse.

In December 2024, the company announced plans to move its primary stock market listing from London to the US. It said the US was a "natural long term listing venue" because most of the group's profit came from North America, and its leadership, most of its 25,000 employees and its operational headquarters were all in the US. Following approval from shareholders, the court approved the creation of a new US holding company, Sunbelt Rentals Inc, in February 2026.

== Operations ==
The company operates internationally, servicing customers in Canada, the United States and the United Kingdom. Approximately 85% of its revenue is generated in the United States through the subsidiary Sunbelt Rentals, currently present in over 1,000 locations across the United States and Canada.

The company's non-executive directors are Paul Walker, Angus Cockburn, Jill Easterbrook, Tanya Fratto, Reneta Ribeiro, Lucinda Riches and Lindsley Ruth.

=== British operations ===
Sunbelt Rentals, formerly known as A-Plant, is present in over 185 locations throughout the United Kingdom, and has the following divisions:

- A-Plant, Plant
- A-Plant, Accommodation
- Astra Site Services, Excavator Attachments
- Brightlights
- FLG Services, Lifting and Handling Specialists
- Hoist-It LTD
- GB Access
- Hewden Industrial, equipment hire to the petrochemical industry
- Leada Acrow
- Live Trakway
- Mather+Stuart Power Solutions
- PSS Hire
- Rapid Climate Control
- Tool Hire Express
- A-Plant, Powered Access
- A-Plant Customer Training Solutions
- A-Plant, Rail
- A-Plant, Lux Traffic Systems
- Opti-cal Survey Equipment (Survey Hire Express)
