= Cirata =

Software companies of England

- Formerly: WANdisco, plc.
- Type: Public limited company
- Traded as: AIM: CRTA
- Industry: Data Orchestration; Data Modernisation; Disaster Recovery; AI Enablement
- Founded: San Ramon, California, U.S. (2005)
- Founder: David Richards, Dr. Yeturu Aahlad
- Headquarters: London, United Kingdom; Belfast, United Kingdom; San Ramon, United States
- Key people: Kenneth Lever (Chairman); Stephen Kelly (CEO); Ricardo Moura (CFO); Yeturu Aahlad (Inventor)
- Products: Live Data Migrator, Cirata Symphony
- Number of employees: circa 50
- Website: www.cirata.com

Cirata plc. is a technology company specializing in data management software.

The company is dual-headquartered in London, England and San Ramon, California, with a development hub in Belfast, Northern Ireland.

== History ==
WANdisco was co-founded in 2005 by David Richards and Dr. Yeturu Aahlad. The company's original name was WANdisco, an acronym for wide-area network distributed computing. The company went public via IPO on the London Stock Exchange on 1 June 2012. The same year, WANdisco acquired AltoStor.

On 25 July 2023, the company announced that Stephen Kelly had become chief executive officer, having served as interim chief executive since 10 May 2023.

At the company's Annual General Meeting on 30 August 2023, shareholders voted in favor of the name change to Cirata PLC. This transition was completed by early October 2023, and now trades on AIM under the ticker CRTA.

In July 2025, Cirata agreed to divest its DevOps assets to BlueOptima. This deal was concluded in December 2025 for a total sum of US$3.4 million.

== Controversies ==
In March 2023, WANdisco announced it had uncovered $100 million in false sales bookings made by an unnamed senior sales employee. In April 2023, the Financial Conduct Authority opened an investigation into the matter, and closed its investigation in November 2025, with no action being taken against the company.
