= David Richards (businessman) =

British businessman

David Richards MBE
- Born: 13 November 1970 (age 55); Sheffield, United Kingdom
- Alma mater: University of Huddersfield (BSc)
- Known for: Founder & CEO WANdisco PLC); co-founder of Yorkshire AI Labs
- Spouse: Jane Richards
- Children: 2
- Scientific career
- Fields: Enterprise Software; Big Data; Artificial Intelligence; Cloud Computing; Enterprise application integration; Venture Capital
- Workplaces: Druid Group plc; NetManage; WANdisco plc; Yorkshire AI Labs LLP

David James Richards MBE (born 13 November 1970) is a British businessman. He co-founded the WANdisco, a software company, and Yorkshire AI Labs, a venture capital firm. Together with his wife, they founded the David and Jane Richards Family Foundation, a charitable organization for improving the education quality for children in the UK.

== Early Life ==
Richards was born in Sheffield, England in 1970, and received his bachelor's degree in Computer science from the University of Huddersfield in 1992.

== Career ==
Richards founded a consulting firm in the 1990s, selling it in 1998. He then moved to Silicon Valley and started two companies. He co-founded WANdisco in 2005 with Yeturu Aahlad; the company became publicly traded on London Stock Exchange in 2012.

WANdisco was subject to a fraud investigation in March 2023. Richards stepped down one month later. The Financial Conduct Authority reviewed the company's market announcements, eventually closing its investigation in November 2025 with no action taken. Richards was not accused of any wrongdoing.

Richards co-founded Yorkshire AI Labs after leaving WANdisco; the new company is a venture capital based in Sheffield. Richards is the co-founding chairman to IntelliAM AI, a company receiving funding from his venture firm. The firm co-founded numerous other companies, including DigitalCNC, a precision manufacturing software company spun out of the University of Sheffield's Advanced Manufacturing Research Centre; PureTec, and LEXcelerate, a law firm that utilizes artificial intelligence, intended to automate high-volume legal services including residential conveyancing.

== Philanthropy ==
In 2017, Richards and his wife Jane created the David and Jane Richards Family Foundation with approximately £1.5 million. Richards cited frustration at the UK Government's efforts to teach computing skills to schoolchildren and consequently a lack of adequate skills in a future economy where artificial intelligence and automation are prevalent.

During the COVID-19 pandemic Richards co-founded Laptops For Kids, a charitable organisation to facilitate the donation, secure erasure, and distribution of used digital devices, enabling children from disadvantaged backgrounds to have access to the technology they need to participate in remote learning.

== Awards and honours ==
Richards was appointed Member of the Order of the British Empire (MBE) in the 2022 New Year Honours for services to the information technology sector and young people, particularly during Covid-19.

He was awarded an honorary doctorate from The University of Sheffield (2023) for giving distinguished service or bringing distinction to the University, the City of Sheffield, or the region.

He was awarded an honorary doctorate from Sheffield Hallam University (2017) in recognition of him being a champion of British technology and a passionate advocate of entrepreneurship.
