= Brendan Horgan =

American business executive

- Education: Radford University
- Occupation: Businessman
- Title: CEO, Ashtead Group
- Term: May 2019-
- Predecessor: Geoff Drabble

Brendan Horgan is an American businessman, and the CEO of Ashtead Group, an industrial equipment rental company and FTSE 100 Index constituent, since May 2019.

In 1996, Horgan joined Sunbelt Rentals, Ashtead's North American business, rising to chief executive in January 2011. In January 2018, he was appointed chief operating officer of Ashtead, retaining his responsibilities at Sunbelt.

In November 2018, it was announced that Geoff Drabble would retire as CEO of Ashtead Group on 1 May 2019, and be succeeded by Horgan.

Horgan lives in Charlotte, North Carolina, US.
