= Sage Group =

British multinational enterprise accounting software company

Coordinates: 55.019364°N 1.50178°W

The Sage Group plc

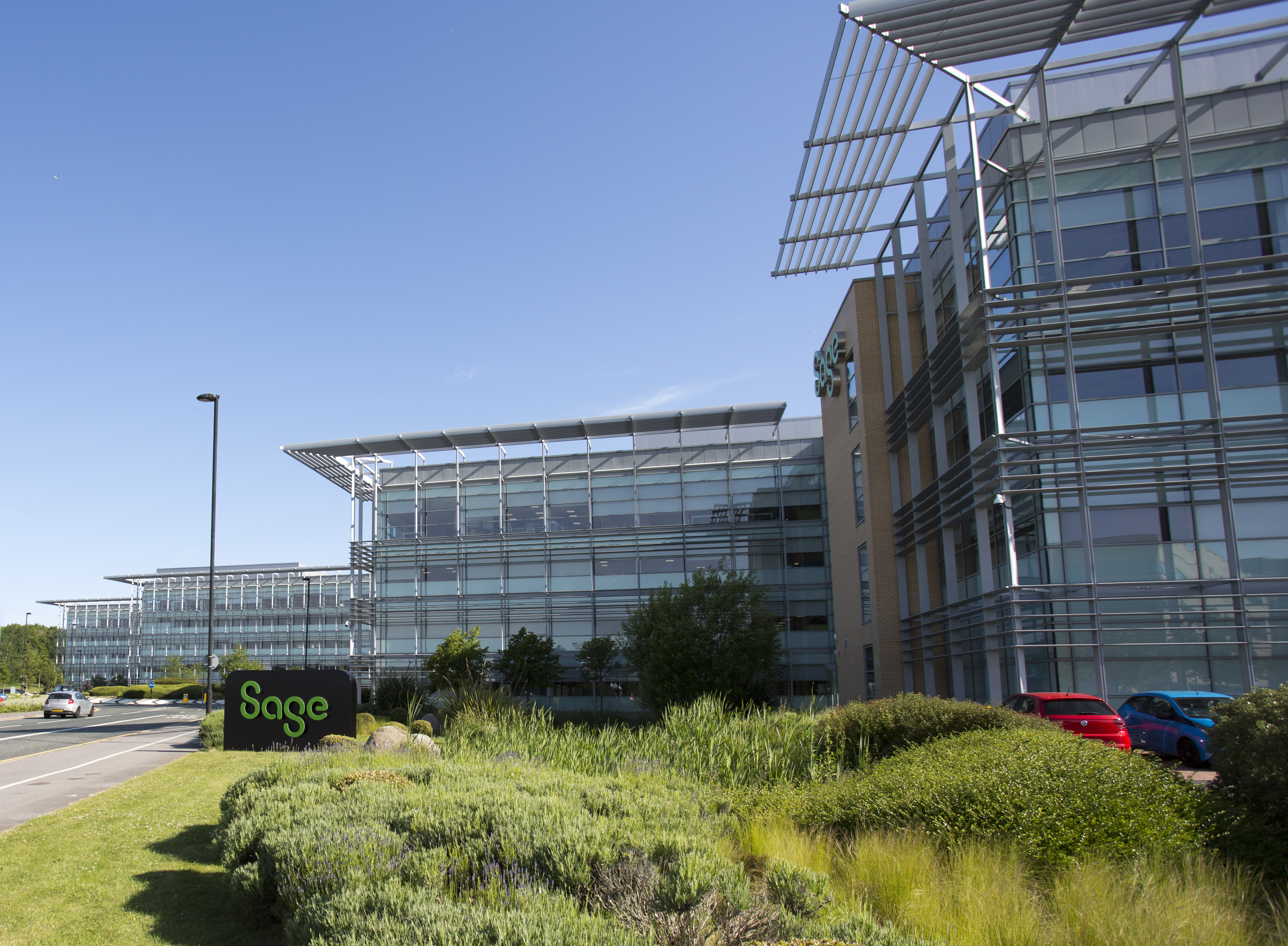
- The Sage global headquarters in North Tyneside, UK
- Type: Public limited company
- Traded as: LSE: SGE; FTSE 100 Component
- Industry: Software
- Founded: 27 April 1981; 45 years ago
- Founder: David Goldman; Paul Muller; Sir Graham Wylie CBE
- Headquarters: Newcastle upon Tyne, England, UK
- Number of locations: Offices in 23 countries
- Area served: Worldwide
- Key people: Donald Brydon (Chairperson); Steve Hare (CEO)
- Products: Accounting; CRM; MRP
- Revenue: ▲£ 2,783 million (2026)
- Operating income: ▲£ 600 million (2026)
- Net income: ▲£ 401 million (2026)
- Total assets: ▲£ 3,982 million (2026)
- Total equity: ▼£ 407 million (2026)
- Number of employees: 11,074 (2025)
- Website: www.sage.com

The Sage Group plc, commonly known as Sage, is a British multinational enterprise software company headquartered in Newcastle upon Tyne, England. It develops accounting, financial management, payroll and human-resources software, mainly for small and medium-sized businesses. Its products include Sage 50, Sage Intacct and Sage X3.

Founded in 1981, Sage was listed on the London Stock Exchange in 1989 and joined the FTSE 100 Index in 1999. The company was long associated with desktop accounting software but has increasingly shifted towards cloud-based subscription services.

In 2025, Sage reported revenue of £2.51 billion and employed about 11,000 people across 17 countries.

== History ==
=== 1981 to 2000 ===
The company was founded by David Goldman, Paul Muller, and Graham Wylie in 1981 in Newcastle upon Tyne, to develop estimating and accounting software for small businesses.

A student at Newcastle University, Graham Wylie, took a summer job with an accountancy firm funded by a government small business grant to write software to help their record keeping. This became the basis for Sage Line 50. Next, hired by David Goldman to write some estimating software for his printing company, Campbell Graphics, Graham used the same accounting software to produce the first version of Sage Accounts. David was so impressed that he hired Graham and academic Paul Muller to form Sage, selling its software first to printing companies, and then to a wider market through a network of resellers.

In 1984, the company launched Sage software, a product for the Amstrad PCW word processor, which used the CP/M operating system. Sage software sales escalated in that year from 30 copies per month to over 300. The company was first listed on the London Stock Exchange in 1989.

In 1991, Sage acquired the pioneering American accounting software developer Dac Software, Inc. from Insilco Corporation, who were undergoing bankruptcy reorganization at the time. Dac Software were well known for their DacEasy software suite, which was one of the first integrated accounting software titles to retail for well under $100, when most of its competitors sold suites with equivalent functionality for thousands of US$.

In June 1991, Sage Group moved into its first dedicated headquarters building, Sage House, in Benton, Newcastle upon Tyne, having previously been located in the Regent Centre office park.

In 1994, Paul Walker was appointed Chief Executive. In 1998, Sage's Professional Accountants Division was established. In 1999, Sage entered the FTSE 100 index, and launched a dedicated Irish division, based in Dublin as well as its e-business strategy. In that same year, the UK acquisition of Tetra saw Sage enter the mid-range business software market.

Sage was the best-performing UK share in the 1990s, increasing in value by 28,000%.

=== 2000 to 2010 ===
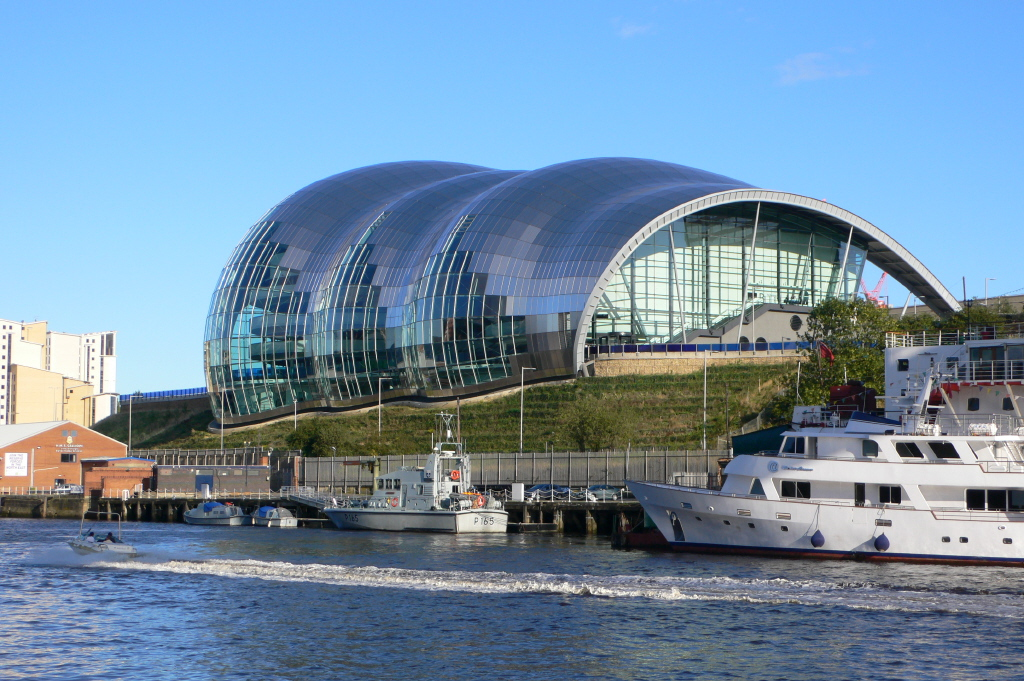
The Glasshouse music venue, located on the banks of the River Tyne, was named the Sage Gateshead during its sponsorship.

In 2001, Sage acquired Interact Commerce Inc. and entered the CRM/contact management market and in 2002 Sage won "Business of The Year" in the National Business Awards. Also that year, Sage sponsored the new Music Centre in Gateshead for £6m – known at the time as Sage Gateshead – the largest ever UK arts/business sponsorship. Sage are one of two technology stocks listed on the FTSE 100 Index, the other being Micro Focus. In 2003, at age 43, Graham Wylie retired with 108.5 million shares in Sage worth £146m. He was rated Britain's 109th richest person in the 2002 Sunday Times Rich List.

In 2004, the company completed its £50 million headquarters in the Great Park area of Newcastle upon Tyne.

Tony Hobson joined the Sage board of directors in June 2004 and became chairman in May 2007.

=== 2010 to present ===
On 19 April 2010, Sage announced that its CEO, Paul Walker, had indicated an interest in stepping down from his position, which he had held for 16 years. The Financial Times reported that his departure would lead to speculation over Sage's mergers and acquisitions, which had been a key component to the group's growth in the past 20 years.

Walker was one of the longest serving CEOs of an FTSE100 company. Walker left the company on 1 December 2010.

On 1 October 2010 Guy Berruyer became CEO of Sage Group; Berruyer had previously been CEO of Sage's Mainland Europe & Asia operations.

On 15 February 2013, Sage announced that Accel-KKR intended to buy Sage Nonprofit Solutions, its division that produced software designed for nonprofit organisations and governmental agencies.

In August 2014, Sage announced that Guy Berruyer would retire. Stephen Kelly, the UK government's former chief operating officer, became group CEO in November 2014. In September 2014, the company announced the acquisition of PayChoice for $157 million. In 2016 Sage introduced its first AI offering, a chat bot named Pegg.

In March 2017, Sage Group acquired Compass, an analytics and benchmarking platform. In March 2017, Sage Group also acquired Fairsail, a Human Capital Management (HCM) cloud-based platform. In July 2017, Sage purchased Intacct for $850 million.

On 31 August 2018, Sage announced that Stephen Kelly had stepped down as a director and CEO. On 2 November 2018, Steve Hare was appointed CEO. Hare had been chief financial officer of Sage since 2014 and had been interim COO following the departure of the previous CEO.

In March 2020, Sage divested its Brazilian operations to the president of the local business, Jorge Carneiro. In the 2020s, Sage began to integrate artificial intelligence into more of its products. In 2022, Sage launched a carbon accounting product, Sage Earth.

In 2021, Sage's Newcastle headquarters moved to Cobalt Park.

In February 2024, Sage announced the release of Sage Copilot, a generative AI-powered assistant, and the integration of its features into both its online and hybrid-desktop products. In July 2025, Sage announced its acquisition of Fyle, an AI-powered expense management platform.

In March 2026, Sage and Barclays entered a strategic partnership to integrate banking and accounting services for UK small businesses, a move described as a shift toward embedded finance aimed at reducing administrative burdens and supporting compliance with Making Tax Digital (MTD) regulations.

== Products and services ==
Sage develops accounting, payroll, human-resources and financial-management software for small and medium-sized businesses. Its products range from desktop accounting software to fully cloud-based services. Its main products are Sage Intacct, Sage 50, Sage 200 and Sage X3. Sage also offers products including Sage Accounting, Sage Payroll, Sage HR and Sage Sole Trader.

Sage Intacct is a cloud-based financial-management platform for growing and mid-sized businesses and has become an important part of Sage's business in North America and has been expanding in the UK and Europe.

Sage 50 is primarily accounting software for smaller businesses, while Sage 200 provides broader financial, inventory and business-management functions for growing companies. Sage X3 is an enterprise resource planning system for larger and more complex organisations, covering finance, supply chain and manufacturing.

In the UK, Sage offers Making Tax Digital software, including Sage Sole Trader for Income Tax and Sage Accounting for both VAT and Income Tax. Sage Sole Trader is available free of charge to non-VAT-registered sole traders.

== Operations ==
Sage is headquartered at Cobalt Park near Newcastle upon Tyne. In 2004, the company moved its headquarters to a £50 million complex at Newcastle Great Park. It relocated from Great Park to Cobalt Park in 2021.

The company's North American headquarters are at Ponce City Market in Atlanta, Georgia, where the company opened a new office in 2025.

Sage organises its business into three regions: North America; the UK, Ireland, Africa and Asia-Pacific, which Sage reports together as UKIA; and Europe. It serves around six million small and medium-sized businesses.

In 2025, the company employed an average of 11,074 people, including 2,757 in North America, 4,889 in UKIA and 3,428 in Europe.

== Financial performance ==
Recent financial results are shown below.

| Year | Revenue | Underlying growth | Operating profit | Pre-tax profit |
|---|---|---|---|---|
| 2019 | 1,936 | 6% | 382 | 361 |
| 2020 | 1,903 | 8% | 404 | 373 |
| 2021 | 1,846 | 5% | 373 | 347 |
| 2022 | 1,949 | 6% | 367 | 337 |
| 2023 | 2,184 | 10% | 315 | 282 |
| 2024 | 2,332 | 9% | 452 | 426 |
| 2025 | 2,513 | 10% | 530 | 484 |
| 2026 | 2,783 | 11% | 600 | 527 |

== Sponsorships ==
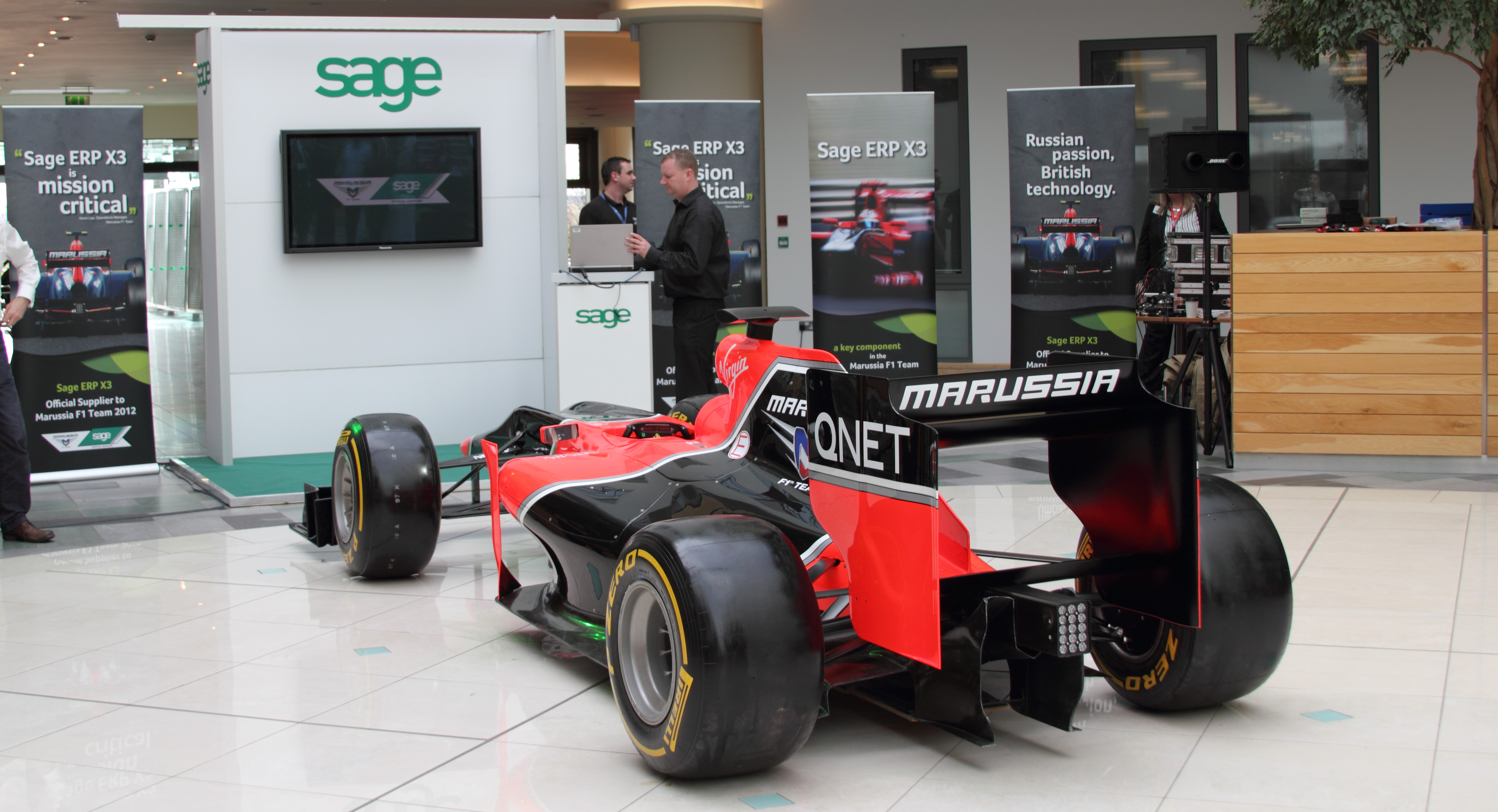
A Marussia F1 promotional car on display in Sage's Newcastle headquarters.

The Sage Group was a patron of The Sage Gateshead, a Tyneside music venue designed by Sir Norman Foster. Now known as the Glasshouse Gateshead, it was completed in 2004 at a cost of £70 million, and has since become a main sight on the River Tyne. It is primarily used as a concert venue and centre for musical education, but also hosts other events including conferences.

In 2008, Sage funded the revival of The Krypton Factor television series for ITV as a part of the Business Brain Training campaign. Sage were the football shirt sponsor in May 2011 for Whitley Bay F.C.'s FA Vase winning match. Sage had previously been a minor sponsor for Newcastle United F.C.

For the 2012 Formula One season, Sage were an official supplier for the Marussia F1 team, and for the 2013 and 2014 seasons Sage logos were placed on the car. For the 2017–18 Bristol City F.C. season, Sage has partnered with Bristol City F.C. as minor sponsor through its provision of Sage X3 for Bristol Sport.

Sage sponsored the Invictus Games in a multi-year partnership starting in 2016. Sage also sponsored the 2019 editions of the Reading Half Marathon and the Blaydon Race. Sage are an official partner of The Hundred cricket tournament. In 2025 Sage became the Official Finance Software Partner of the LPGA in a multi-year deal.

Sage are sponsoring the 2023 Rugby World Cup, as well as the Six Nations Championship. Starting in the 2023 season Sage are an official partner of Major League Baseball. Additionally, opening 2025, Sage are the named sponsor of the new Newcastle Gateshead Quayside arena and conference centre, named "The Sage".

== See also ==
- Comparison of accounting software
- Comparison of CRM systems
- List of ERP software packages
