= Sage Intacct =

American financial software company

Sage Intacct, Inc

- Formerly: Intacct Corporation
- Type: Subsidiary
- Industry: Software
- Founded: 1999; 27 years ago
- Founder: Odysseas Tsatalos; David Chandler Thomas
- Headquarters: San Jose, California
- Key people: Steve Hare (CEO – The Sage Group plc)
- Products: Accounting software
- Number of employees: 500 (2018)
- Parent: Sage Group
- Website: www.sageintacct.com

Sage Intacct, Inc is an American provider of cloud-based accounting software and services available a number of regions around the globe – including the United States, Canada, the UK, Australia, South Africa, Germany and France. Its products offer cloud-based accounting applications that enable business payments, manage and pay bills, and facilitate payroll functions.

The company was founded in 1999 and it was acquired by The Sage Group for $850 million in 2017.

== History ==
Intacct was founded by Odysseas Tsatalos and David Chandler Thomas in 1999 as one of the first accounting applications for the cloud. The company was headquartered in San Jose, California, grew organically and offered a suite of accounting software that could serve medium and large-sized businesses with consolidated enterprise resource planning (ERP), and e-commerce features.

In 2000, Intacct got its first institutional investor, venture capital firm HWVP and completed a Series A round of $10 million. From 2001 to 2014, the company raised $130 million in funding primarily led by the Battery Ventures, BVP, Sigma Partners and Emergence Capital with the last round of $30 million in 2014 with the company valuation of $211 million.

In 2017, Intacct Corporation was acquired by the British multinational accounting software company, The Sage Group PLC, for $850 million and was subsequently rebranded as Sage Intacct.

== Features ==
Sage Intacct has a suite of subscription-based accounting products. Its web-based applications are built on top of its internally developed platform. Sage Intacct's application includes accounts payable, accounts receivable, cash management, collaborate, general ledger, order management, purchasing, and reporting and dashboards.

In addition to the core financial product, Sage Intacct released add-on software applications for contract and subscription billing, contract revenue management, fixed assets, inventory management, multi-entity and global consolidations, project accounting, project billing, sales and use tax, time and expense management and vendor payment services. It allows integration of third-party software such as ScanForce, Salesforce, Certify, ADP, SAP Concur and others.

== Operations ==
Founded and headquartered in San Jose, the company initially grew organically, but more recently has grown primarily through acquisitions. In addition to its US offices, it also operates in India and Romania, as well as product localizations being developed at Sage's other international offices such as Barcelona, Spain, Newcastle upon Tyne, UK and Poland.

== See also ==
- Comparison of accounting software
