= Graham Wylie =

British businessman

Sir Graham Wylie CBE
- Born: Andrew William Graham Wylie; 12 August 1959 (age 66)
- Occupation: Businessman
- Known for: Sage Group; Technology Services Group

Sir Andrew William Graham Wylie CBE (born 12 August 1959) is a British businessman and co-founder of Sage Group, the United Kingdom's largest software business.

== Early life ==
Wylie was raised in the North East of England, the son of a Scottish miner from Stirling; Wylie's mother was originally from Hawick. In 1980, Wylie attained a bachelor's degree in Computer Science and Statistics from Newcastle University.

== Career ==
In 1981 Wylie co-founded Sage Group with David Goldman and Paul Muller, having programmed the initial Sage accounts package himself. The Sage Group quickly grew to be a successful worldwide financial software company and is the only software company listed on the FTSE 100. In 2003, Wylie sold his stake in Sage for an estimated £195 million.

In October 2003, Wylie founded Technology Services Group and in the following years expanded that company primarily through acquisition.

Speedflex (Europe) Ltd was formed in 2011 by chairman Wylie, Paul Ferris and Alan Shearer.

Wylie was appointed Commander of the Order of the British Empire (CBE) in the 2003 New Year Honours and was knighted in the 2020 New Year Honours for services to business and charity. He has been awarded honorary doctorates by Northumbria University in 2000 and Newcastle University in 2004. He has been awarded the freedom of the city of Newcastle upon Tyne.

== Personal life ==
In 2003 Wylie married his second wife, Andrea Wylie. He and his wife also own a number of racehorses and Close House (a mansion with golf course). Wylie's horses have raced at some of the sport's most prestigious events including the Grand National and the Cheltenham Festival, where they have won on 13 different occasions.

Wylie and his wife purchased Gosforth Shopping Centre for £9.25 million and sold the development more than a decade later for £12.25 million.

Wylie has his own charitable foundation, the "Graham Wylie Foundation", which reportedly gives away 100% of donations to its chosen causes.
