= John G. Horgan =

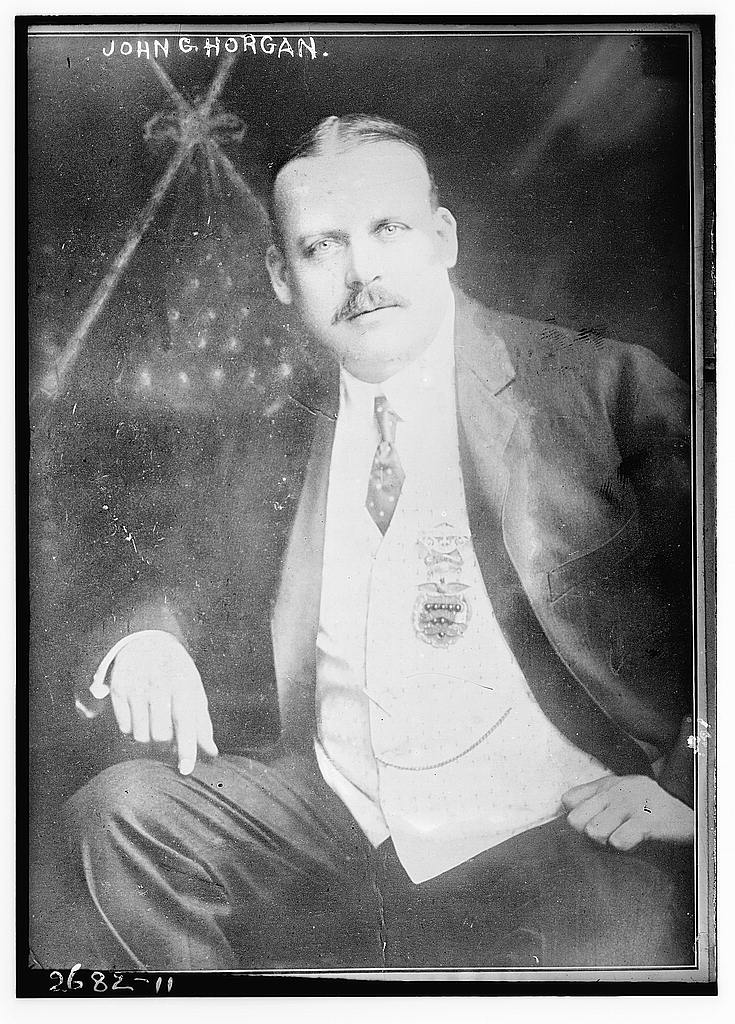
Horgan in 1912

John Gregory Horgan Jr. (1866 – June 24, 1921), nicknamed "the Banker", was an American professional player of pocket billiards and three-cushion billiards.

== Biography ==
Horgan was born in Elmira, New York, the son of John G. Horgan Sr. He became the 1906 world champion in pocket billiards (straight pool) by beating Tommy Hueston He became the world three-cushion billiards champion and holder of the Lambert Emblem trophy in 1912 by beating Joe Carney, a title he lost to Alfredo de Oro in 1914.

Horgan, who moved to the West Coast around 1891, died in San Francisco, California, following a sudden illness and operation. Horace Lerch, one of his close friends, eulogized him in the Buffalo Courier-Express –

Horgan was one of the greatest of billiardists and very versatile in cue work. While a youth at school he displayed remarkable cleverness in amateur tournaments and match play. He annexed the pocket billiard championships from Hueston in 1906 and in 1912 took the three cushion title and Lambert diamond trophy from Carney. Alfredo de Oro pronounced him the greatest three-cushion player in the world ... praise indeed from such a source.

He was survived by three sisters, Mrs. Daniel Richardson, Letitia Horgan, Mrs. W. H. McGraw, and brothers Edward D. Horgan and George W. Horgan.
