= Paul Walker (businessman) =

British businessman (born 1957)

Paul Ashton Walker
- Born: 17 May 1957 (age 69)
- Occupation: Businessman

Paul Ashton Walker (born 17 May 1957) is a British businessman.

== Education and early career ==
Walker graduated in economics at the University of York. He then began his career as a chartered accountant and auditor at Arthur Young.

=== Career at Sage ===
In 1984 Walker joined Sage Group as a company accountant and then held the role of finance director from 1987 to 1994. In 1994, Walker was appointed chief executive of Sage.

In April 2010, Sage announced that Walker, had indicated an interest in stepping down from his position, which he had held for 16 years. The Financial Times reported that his departure would lead to speculation over Sage's mergers and acquisitions, which have been a key component to the group's growth in the past 20 years. In an interview with The Times, the CEO of Sage's UK business stated that: "Acquisitions are part of our DNA".

Walker was one of the longest serving CEOs of a FTSE 100 company, only exceeded by Sir Martin Sorrell at WPP and Tullow Oil's Aidan Heavey. Walker left the company on 1 December 2010. Walker was succeeded by Guy Berruyer at Sage.

=== Later career ===
Walker has previously served on the boards of Diageo and MyTravel Group. In 2018 Walker was appointed as a director and chairman of Ashtead Group.

Walker is also non-executive chairman of Halma plc and a non-executive director of Experian and Sophos. Walker took on the role of chair of Newcastle University's governing body in August 2017.
