= Ruth Lea, Baroness Lea of Lymm =

British parliamentarian and political economist

The Right Honourable The Baroness Lea of Lymm CBE
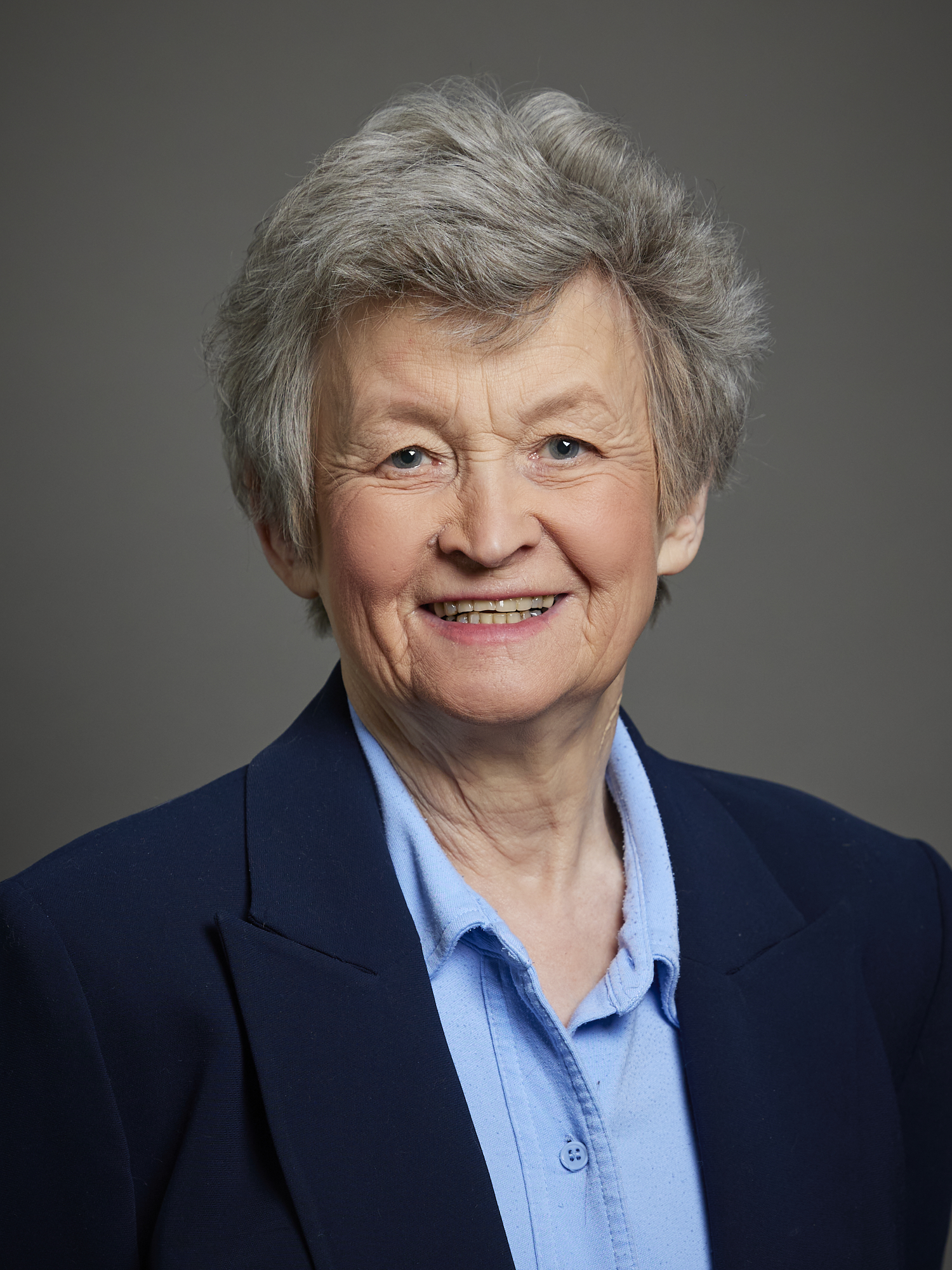
- Official portrait, 2024

Member of the House of Lords
- Lord Temporal
- Life peerage 31 October 2022 – 30 April 2026

Personal details
- Born: Ruth Jane Lea; 22 September 1947 (age 79) Cheshire, England
- Party: Conservative
- Education: University of York; University of Bristol

Ruth Jane Lea, Baroness Lea of Lymm, CBE (born 22 September 1947) is a British parliamentarian and political economist.

Lady Lea entered HM Civil Service, before being recruited by the Institute of Directors, a private-sector employer lobbyist, as well as working for policy research bodies and the media. She was Arbuthnot Banking Group's Economic Adviser from 2007 to 2022 and served as an Independent Non-Executive Director from 2005 until 2016.

== Biography ==
=== Early life and education ===
Born in Cheshire to a farming family, Lea attended Lymm Grammar School before going up to the University of York (BA) then pursuing postgraduate studies at the University of Bristol (MSc). She also studied at the London School of Economics in 1973.

=== Career ===
Lea served almost 16 years in the British Civil Service, working in HM Treasury, the Department of Trade and Industry, the Central Statistical Office and at the Civil Service College, and was also a Lecturer at Thames Polytechnic (now Greenwich University).

In 1988, she joined Mitsubishi Bank in the City rising to Chief Economist and became a regular television and radio commentator on economic matters. She was UK Economist at Lehman Brothers for one year until 1994, before her appointment as ITN's Economics Editor, and subsequently Head of the Policy Unit at the Institute of Directors, a post she held from 1995 to 2003.

Lea was Director of the Centre for Policy Studies from 2004 to 2007 and of Global Vision from 2007 to 2010.

Lea is a prolific writer on economic and business issues. A vocal critic of New Labour's economic policies, arguing that "big state" profligacy undermined both UK public finances and economic competitiveness. Deeply concerned about Britain's high cost and fragile energy policies, she has consistently argued they damage business competitiveness and suggests Britain's trust in climate change policies is unlikely to have much impact on global carbon dioxide emissions given that the UK accounts for only 1½% of the global total.

A robust and consistent opponent of UK membership of the Euro on economic grounds, Lea advocated a reformed relationship between the EU and Britain, proposing, as necessary, renegotiated EU membership terms similar to a Swiss-style agreement with Europe; qv. European Free Trade Association. She supported Brexit.

Having served on the Councils of London University and the Royal Economic Society, the National Consumer Council, the Nurses' Pay Review Body, the Office for National Statistics Advisory Committee, the Economic and Social Research Priorities Board, the Retail Prices Advisory Committee and the Institute of Economic Affairs Shadow Monetary Policy Committee, she has served as a judge for several national achievement awards, and as a Governor of the London School of Economics.

Lea was Economic Adviser to the Arbuthnot Banking Group 2007–2022 and was a non-executive director 2005–16.

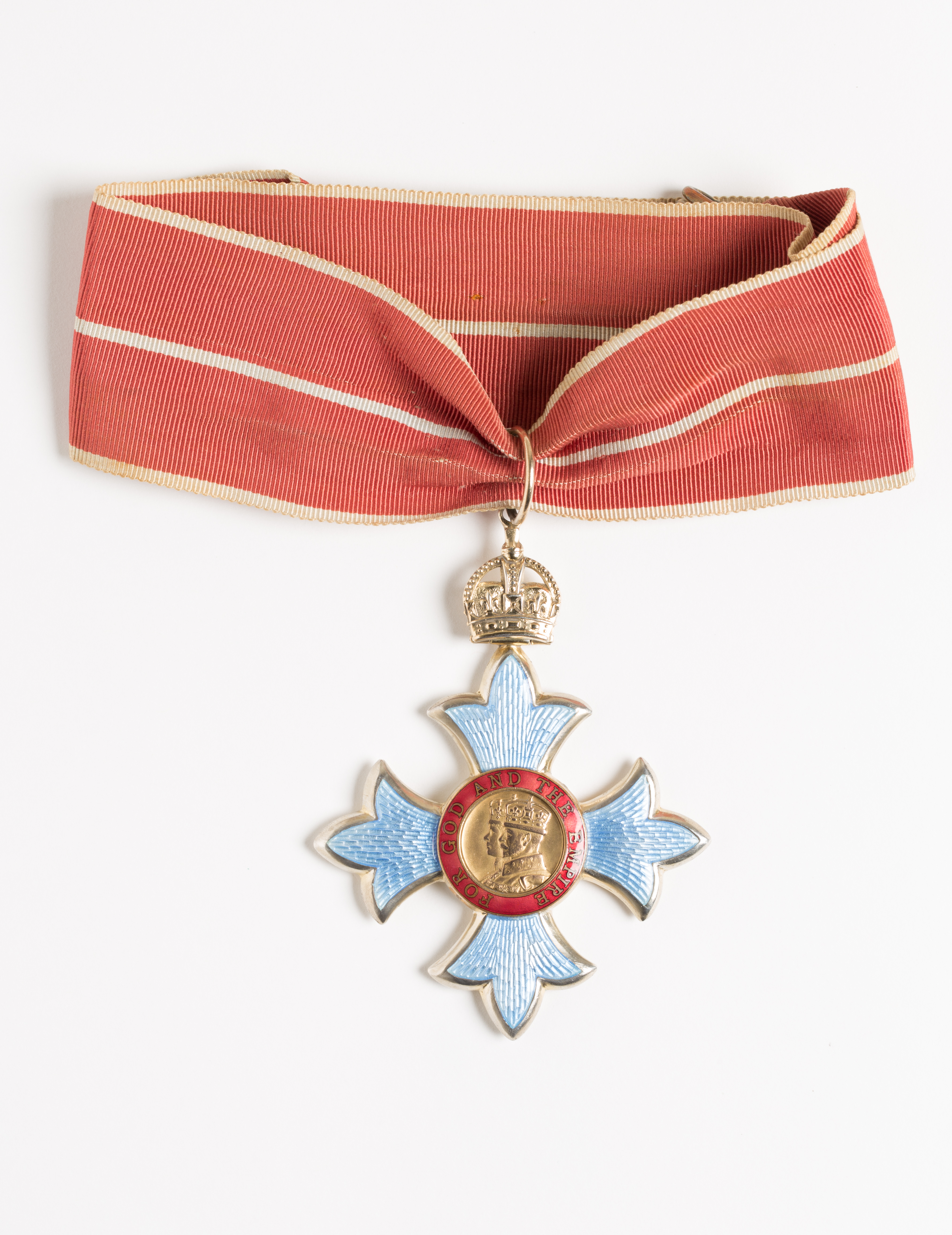
CBE insignia

=== Honours and awards ===
Lea was a Fellow of the Royal Society of Arts and of the Royal Statistical Society. She has also been admitted a Freeman of the City of London and elected an Honorary Liveryman of the Curriers' Company and a Liveryman of the World Traders Company.

Lea was appointed a Commander of the Order of the British Empire (CBE) in the 2015 New Year Honours List for "services to the financial and economic sectors".

She has been awarded honorary doctorates by the University of Greenwich, BPP University College and the University of Chester (Hon DBA).

It was announced on 14 October 2022, that as part of Boris Johnson's 2022 Political Honours, Lea would receive a life peerage. On 31 October 2022, she was created Baroness Lea of Lymm, of Lymm in the Borough of Warrington in the County of Cheshire taking her seat in the House of Lords on 1 November 2022.

=== Views on climate change ===
Lady Lea is a critic of the control of greenhouse gases, stating that "the climate system is far too complex for modest reductions in one of the thousands of factors involved in climate change (ie. carbon emissions) to have a predictable effect in magnitude, or even direction".

== See also ==
- Commonwealth free trade
- European Union free trade agreements
