= Halma plc =

U.K. technology company

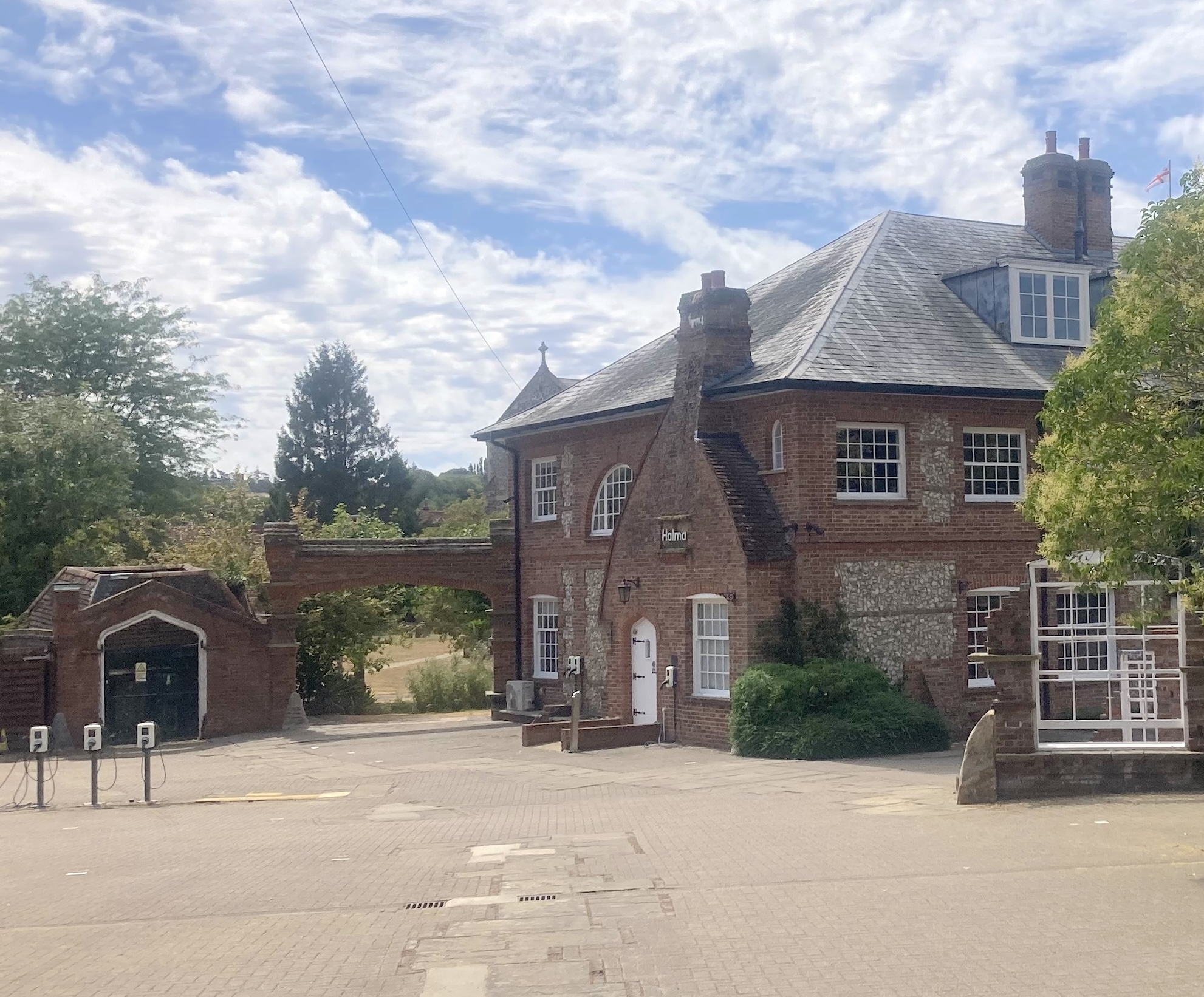
- Headquarters in Amersham, UK
- Type: Public limited company
- Traded as: LSE: HLMA; FTSE 100 component
- Industry: Technology
- Founded: 1894; 132 years ago
- Headquarters: Amersham, England, UK
- Key people: Louise Makin (Chair); Andrew Williams (CEO)
- Products: Fire and gas detection, medical devices, water analysis, safety locks
- Revenue: ▲£2,582.3 million (2026)
- Operating income: ▲£594.5 million (2026)
- Net income: ▲£372.3 million (2026)
- Number of employees: 8,000 (2026)
- Website: www.halma.com

Halma plc is a British global group of safety equipment companies that makes products for hazard detection and life protection based in Amersham, England. It is listed on the London Stock Exchange and is a constituent of the FTSE 100 Index.

== History ==
The company was established in 1894 in Sri Lanka as The Nahalma Tea Estate Company Limited. It switched to rubber production in 1937 and became The Nahalma Rubber Estate Company Limited. During the early 1950s the company's rubber estates were nationalised by the Sri Lankan government, and in 1956 the company became Halma Investments Limited, thereby severing its connections with both tea and rubber and becoming an investment and industrial holding company.

In the early 1970s the company began a sequence of acquisitions in the mechanical, electrical and electronic engineering sectors. The company was renamed Halma Limited in 1973 and registered as a public limited company in 1981, becoming Halma plc. In 1984, the company acquired Apollo Fire Detectors, the largest manufacturer of smoke detectors in the UK.

The company undertook three acquisitions in the second half of 2019, including Ampac, another fire detection business, and two further acquisitions in the medical sector in early 2020.

== Operations ==
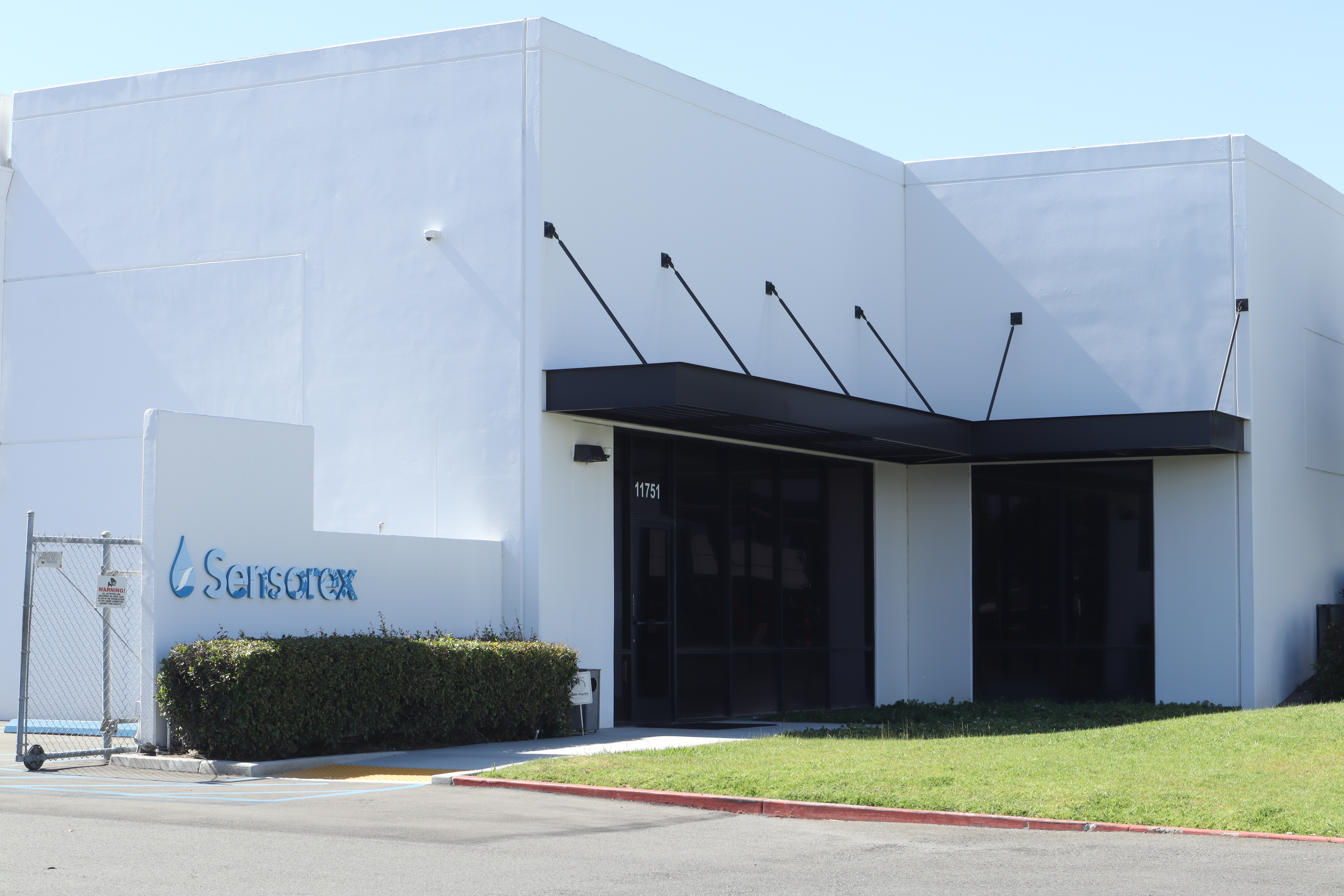
Office of subsidiary Sensorex, Garden Grove, California

The company is organised as follows:

- Safety Sector, including: Advanced, Ampac, Apollo, AVIRE, BEA, Cosasco, E2S, FFE, FirePro, Firetrace, Fortress Safety, Lazer Safe
- Healthcare Sector, including: Arcmed, Cardios, CenTrak, IZI Medical, Keeler, Lamidey Noury Medical, Longer, Medicel, MST, NocaBone

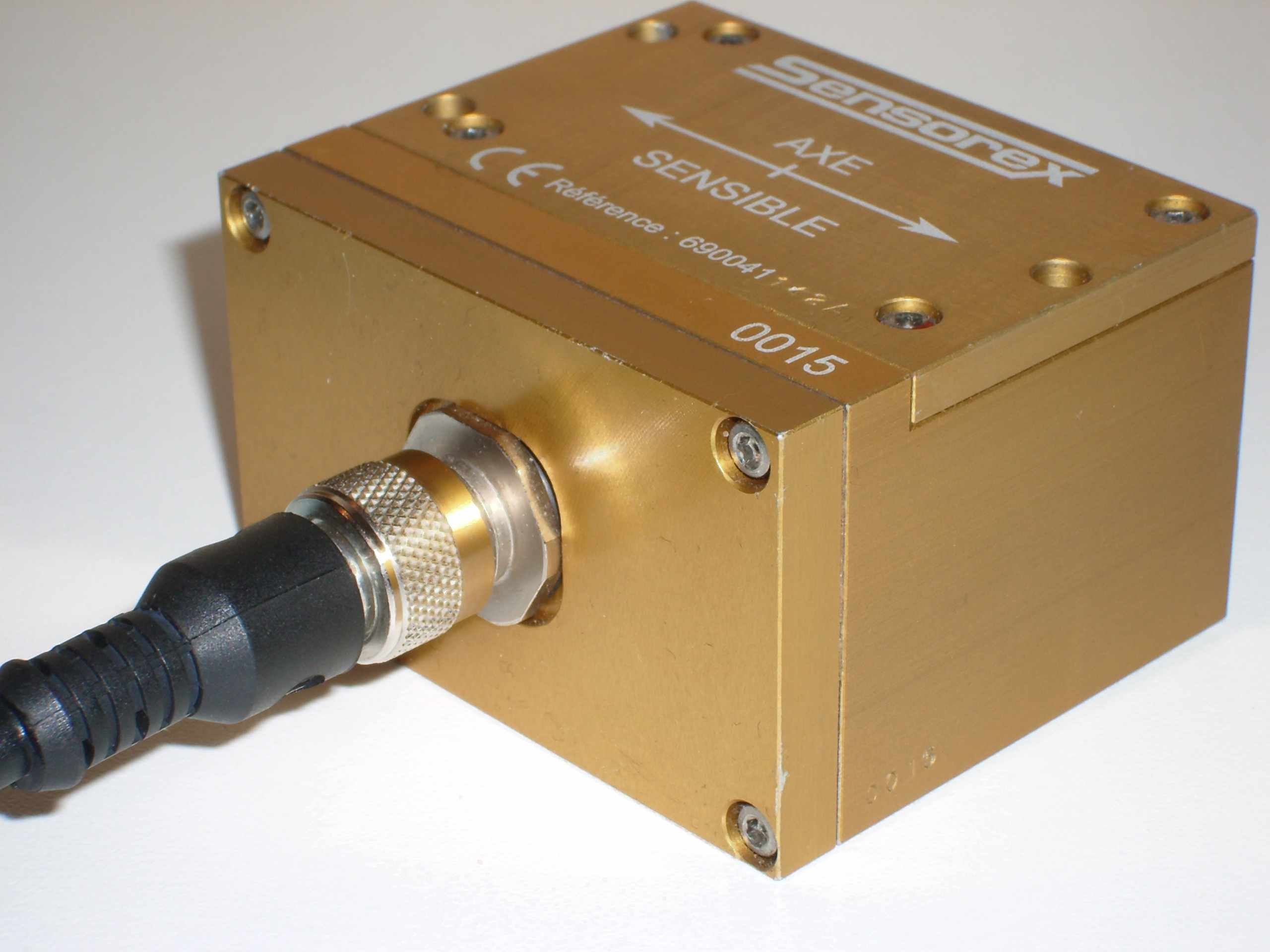
Sensorex inclinometer

- Environmental & Analysis Sector, including: Alicat, Avo Photonics, Brownline, Crowncon, Deep Trekker, HWM Global, Minicam Group, Nuvonic, Ocean Optics, Palintest, SENSIT, Sensorex
