= CYMA (software) =

Series of accounting software packages

- Developer: CYMA Systems
- Release: 1980
- Operating system: Microsoft Windows, Unix, Linux
- Type: Accounting software
- License: Proprietary
- Website: www.cyma.com

CYMA is the name of a series of accounting software packages, developed by Tempe-based company CYMA Systems.

== History ==
CYMA Systems' earliest software, introduced in 1980, was DOS-based; as of 2021 most packages require either "Windows 7 or higher", Unix or Linux. Current offerings are for general accounting (payroll, accounts payable accounts receivable, General Ledger, Inventory Control), or more focused packages which specialize by industry, such as Medical Practice Management or Construction Job Cost Accounting. Their CYMA HR package debuted in 2009. They've also repackaged some programs for non-profits.

Via various software modules, the company "provides third-party integrations, such as: time-tracking software, backup services, direct deposit services" and "can also import common financial file types, print checks, manage electronic payments, and prepare bank deposits."

== Controversy ==
The private company's president was charged by the U.S. Securities and Exchange Commission as having "ordered a subordinate to lie to auditors about whether CYMA had actually placed a large order" with another company "said to have falsified its books from 1993 to 1997."
