= Journal entry =

Act of keeping or making records of transactions

A journal entry is the act of keeping or making records of any transactions either economic or non-economic.

Transactions are listed in an accounting journal that shows a company's debit and credit balances. The journal entry can consist of several recordings, each of which is either a debit or a credit. The total of the debits must equal the total of the credits, or the journal entry is considered unbalanced.

Journal entries can record unique transactions or recurring items such as depreciation or bond amortization. In accounting software, journal entries are usually entered using a separate module from accounts payable, which typically has its own subledger, that indirectly affects the general ledger. As a result, journal entries directly change the account balances on the general ledger. A properly documented journal entry consists of the correct date, amount(s) that will be debited, amount that will be credited, narration of the transaction, and unique reference number (i.e. check number).

In a real business, recording transactions and recurring items involves practical application of accounting principles. For instance, if ABC Company sells a laptop for $300 in cash, the journal entry would be a debit to the Cash account for $300 and a credit to the Sales account for $300. This follows the rule that an increase in assets (cash) is debited, and revenue from sales is credited.

== Recording ==
In order to record journal entries, one needs to have knowledge about-:

1. Type of Accounts
2. Golden Rules of Accounting
3. Experience of Working
4. Knowledge on debit and credit transactions of accounting

== Type of accounts ==
There are three types of accounts in accounting:

1. Personal accounts are accounts which are related to a legal person or a firm (eg. ABC Private Limited). ( Rule: Debit the receiver, credit the giver )
2. Real accounts are accounts which are related to assets. Intangible assets are also considered as Real Accounts. ( Rule: Debit what comes in, credit what goes out. )
3. Nominal Accounts are related to expenses, losses, incomes, and gains. ( Rule: Debit all expenses/losses, credit all incomes/gains. )

There are also subtypes of personal account:

1. Natural Personal accounts are the accounts of individuals.
2. Artificial Personal accounts are the accounts of companies.
3. Representative Personal accounts represent the owner.

== See also ==
- Closing Entry
- Double-entry bookkeeping system
- Debits and credits
- Single-entry bookkeeping system
- Trial balance
- Trade
