= Controlling account =

Accounting concept

In accounting, the controlling account (also known as an adjustment or control account) is an account in the general ledger for which a corresponding subsidiary ledger has been created. The subsidiary ledger allows for tracking transactions within the controlling account in more detail. Individual transactions are posted both to the controlling account and the corresponding subsidiary ledger, and the totals for both are compared when preparing a trial balance to ensure accuracy.

For example, "accounts receivable" is the controlling account for the accounts receivable subsidiary ledger. In this subsidiary ledger, each credit customer has their own account with its own balance. Thus, while the "accounts receivable balance" can report how much the company is owed, the accounts receivable subsidiary ledger can report how much is owed from each credit customer.

Other examples of controlling accounts and their subsidiary ledgers include "accounts payable" (accounts payable subsidiary ledger) and "equipment" (equipment subsidiary ledger).

In common use, control accounts refer to those that would, under ideal circumstances, balance to zero. For example, an inventory control account will hold the balance amount between a stock account updated by stock transactions on the balance sheet and the value of stock on hand multiplied by its unit cost. Ideally these would be the same value but rarely are. Reasons for discrepancies include stock losses and gains yet to be "journaled" and the control account measures the differences and provides financial visibility and control of the value of those. If the discrepancy is significant, then actions such as stock counts can be triggered in order to validate stock and correct the balance sheet and clear the control account. Other examples would be the "goods received not invoiced" account.
