= Commercial credit reporting =

Maintenance and reporting of credit histories and risks for commercial companies

Commercial credit reporting is the maintenance and reporting of credit histories and risks for commercial companies. These reports are typically created by credit rating agencies that also create credit ratings to help assess companies.

Commercial credit reporting is similar to consumer credit reports but specifically for businesses to assess risk in extending loans, insuring businesses, underwriting insurance risk, purchasing businesses, investing in businesses and most of all in shipping goods to business on credit terms. Government departments are also large users of commercial credit for regulating businesses and in collecting taxes.

Commercial credit is more volatile than consumer credit. Few businesses survive five years in the same form that they were first founded. All businesses are in constant competition with other businesses for clients and markets. The granting of credit by businesses is very much a market driven and few regulations exist.

== History ==
Every country in the world has commercial (or mercantile) credit reporting agencies, if for no other reason than to allow foreign exporters to assess the risk in shipping goods to a wholesaler in that country. They can be large public corporations like U.S.A. headquartered, Dun & Bradstreet Inc. (traded on the New York Stock Exchange, established in 1842) with thousands of employees and offices and correspondents around the world. They can also be smaller private operations that market unbiased scores, such as Global Credit Services, Rapid Ratings International, and Ansonia Credit Data or one man operations serving a limited number of local and foreign clients in a small country.

Before telephones and the internet, the only way to gather risk information on a business was to visit the business owner at their place of business. Credit reporters would ask the owner for the names of the companies that supplied them on credit terms, what banks they dealt with and detailed questions about number of employees, what was sold, etc. They would then contact these suppliers and banks for reference information. It took days, even weeks, to fulfill a request for a commercial credit report.

Electronic communication and computers changed the gathering of commercial risk information. Credit reports can now be compiled in seconds without human intervention and without a business owners knowledge. Suppliers are now requested to supply frequent aged trial balance down loads on all their accounts receivable to commercial credit reporting agencies. These trade payment experiences are linked together to give a profile of how a business is paying numerous suppliers. Collection agencies supply the credit reporting agencies with information on commercial collection claims they receive which are matched to the trade payment experiences.

Public record information such as, bankruptcy filings, legal suits, lease registrations and judgments are also gathered and added to the files on a particular business.

As this information accumulates over many years, trends are identified to track cash flow within a business. Companies unable to come up with sufficient cash to pay suppliers are quickly identified. Computerized monitoring systems tell suppliers when to restrict credit to unhealthy businesses. These comprehensive, detailed reports can be mathematically reduced down to two digit scores that now allow for automated credit approvals and rejections.

All businesses generally compete with other businesses in for clients and markets. The granting of credit by businesses is very much market driven. Retailers often aim thi sell their inventory at a profit before they are required to pay for these goods that they bought on credit. Retailers who can't get credit from suppliers may experience challenges if they are required to pay for their inventory in cash on delivery.

== Regulations ==
Strict laws governing consumer credit reporting agencies rarely include commercial credit reporting agencies. Any complaints about the accuracy or incompleteness of information in a commercial credit report can potentially do harm to the agency's reputation, so they do take complaints seriously. However, unlike consumers, most businesses are oblivious to the risk reports being compiled on them. They may never be aware of why they were unable to obtain credit from a supplier. Suppliers are not required to provide credit to customers. Since only about 20% of businesses subscribe to commercial credit reports, a business that was turned down by one supplier will most likely be able to find an alternative source of supply.
