= Balance transfer =

Banking term for moving an amount of money from one account into another

A balance transfer is the transfer of (part of) the balance (either of money or credit) in an account to another account, often held at another institution. It is most commonly used when describing a credit card balance transfer.

== How it works ==
Balance transfers allow people to move their balances from one credit card to another offering a lower interest rate for a set period of time.

The overall amount and the types of balances that can be transferred depends on the credit card as well as credit score. Moreover, balance transfer should be done as per the timings allocated by the credit card company.

While many credit card issuers offer 0% interest balance transfers, some issuers also charge a transfer fee, which could range from 0–5%. As a result, consumers should evaluate the balance transfer interest rate during the promotional period, the length of the promotional period, and the balance transfer fee when deciding on which balance transfer promotion is best.

== Types ==
There can be transfers between two similar types of accounts or different ones. These include:

- Credit card accounts
- Bank savings accounts
- Bank checking accounts
- Trading accounts at financial institutions

Transfers are sometimes facilitated by companies trying to recruit new consumers. Sometimes transfers are accompanied by transaction costs paid by the consumer.

== See also ==
- Credit card balance transfer
