= Credit card balance transfer =

Transfer of credit card debt between accounts at different companies

A credit card balance transfer is the transfer of the outstanding debt (the balance) in a credit card account to an account held at another credit card company.

This process is encouraged by most credit card issuers as a means to attract customers. The new bank/card issuer makes this arrangement attractive to consumers by offering incentives. Such incentives include low or even 0% interest rates, a temporary interest-free period, loyalty points, or other incentives. The 0% rate promotion is the most common incentive when a new account is opened. Especially low rates compared to the existing supplier entice potential customers to transfer their debt. The card issuers gain new customers, knowing that these holders are prone to accruing debt rather than regularly paying off the balance, which makes them a particularly desirable type of client.

Credit card terms specify the order in which payments are applied to balance(s). In some cases, payments are applied to the lowest-rate balances first and the highest-rate last. In the US, since the CARD Act of 2009 went into effect, payments above the minimum will apply to the highest-interest balance first. In countries such as Australia and Germany, legislation requires the card company to instead first apply payments to the highest-rate balances. The banks invariably set the order of payment to ensure any balance at a reduced or fixed rate will be paid off sooner than new purchases or cash advances at a higher rate. By avoiding making purchases or taking cash advances, the borrower can ensure that interest accrued every month is at the low beneficial rate of the original balance transfer.

The process of a balance transfer can usually be concluded within hours. Automated services facilitate balance transfers between card issuers.

Balances cannot be transferred between cards with the same bank.

A transaction fee is a one-off commission charged by the company that receives the balance. This varies from (typically) 1-5% of transferred debt usually with a minimum value and sometimes with a maximum capped amount. The fee is usually added to the card balance.

== Promotional offers ==
Companies often temporarily lower interest rates for promotional offers. The lower the interest rate, the less the cardholder ends up repaying. Balance transfers involving a transfer of funds from a high-interest credit card or a store card to another card results in a reduction in interest fees for the cardholder. It is in the cardholder's interest to seek out a low-interest rate. Once the promotional rate expires, any remaining transferred balance on the card is subject to the standard interest rate. The Coronavirus has shortened the length of some promotional period for balance transfers.

Promotional balance transfer rates are usually only guaranteed as long as the account is current, meaning the cardholder consistently makes at least the minimum monthly payment. Failure to make these payments usually results in reversion to the much higher standard rate.

Cardholders with large debts can repeatedly transfer their balances to save significant interest repayments. The ideal approach is to switch to a new credit card the moment the previous one's teaser rate expires. To deter this type of behavior, some issuers stopped offering free balance transfers or impose a fee which can be a minimum amount or a percentage of outstanding balance being transferred. There is a caveat: the credit card contract may include a clause preventing the credit card holder from transferring the balance a second time within a certain period of time.

While the promotional interest rate applies and the minimum payment value remains low the cardholder has little incentive to repay the card balance resulting in prolonged debt. In the US card issuers are under pressure from various Federal agencies to increase the minimum payment value. Card issuers have raised minimum payment requirements to encourage cardholders to pay off their balances. These changes have made it less attractive to carry debt, despite any promotional APR.
