= Applied Education =

Applied Education is a school for bookkeepers and tax agents in Australia approved by the Tax Practitioners Board and Institute of Certified Bookkeepers.

== Purpose ==
The Australian Government created legislation called the Tax Agent Services Act 2009 (TASA) to ensure that people preparing Business Activity Statements for a fee are registered. The Tax Practitioners Board administers and manages the registration of bookkeepers in Australia. Before this, anyone could act as a bookkeeper, creating concern that businesses were receiving poor advice from unqualified people.

Applied Education is a Registered Training Organisation, which commenced in 1999.
