= Memo posting =

Banking practice

Memo-posting is a banking practice used in traditional batch processing systems where temporary credit or debit entries are made to an account before the final balance update occurs during end-of-day (EOD) processing. The temporary entry created during memo-posting is reversed once the actual transaction is posted during batch processing. Some modern banking systems implement real-time posting.

Examples:

- When a customer receives a same-day electronic credit, the actual transaction will be processed during EOD batch posting. To provide immediate access to the funds, the bank creates a temporary memo credit that increases the available balance. Later, this entry will be removed as part of the EOD batch process.
- While ATM withdrawals are officially recorded during EOD batch processing, the withdrawal amount is memo-posted immediately as a debit to prevent account overdrafts before final processing.
