= Financial accounting =

Field of accounting

Financial accounting is a branch of accounting concerned with the summary, analysis and reporting of financial transactions related to a business. This involves the preparation of financial statements available for public use. Stockholders, suppliers, banks, employees, government agencies, business owners, and other stakeholders are examples of people interested in receiving such information for decision making purposes.

The International Financial Reporting Standards (IFRS) is a set of accounting standards stating how particular types of transactions and other events should be reported in financial statements. IFRS are issued by the International Accounting Standards Board (IASB).

While financial accounting is used to prepare accounting information for people outside the organization or not involved in the day-to-day running of the company, managerial accounting provides accounting information to help managers make decisions to manage the business. Cost accounting aims to compute the cost of a production or service, facilitate cost control and reduce costs.

== Objectives ==
Financial accounting and financial reporting are often used as synonyms.

1. According to International Financial Reporting Standards: the objective of financial reporting is:
  To provide financial information that is useful to existing and potential investors, lenders and other creditors in making decisions about providing resources to the reporting entity.
2. According to the European Accounting Association:
  Capital maintenance is a competing objective of financial reporting.

== Three components of financial statements ==
=== Cash flow statement ===
The statement of cash flows considers the inputs and outputs in concrete cash within a stated period. The general template of a cash flow statement is as follows:

Cash Inflow - Cash Outflow + Opening Balance = Closing Balance

=== Income statement ===
The statement of profit or income statement represents the changes in value of a company's accounts over a set period (most commonly one fiscal year), and may compare the changes to changes in the same accounts over the previous period. All changes are summarized on the "bottom line" as net income, often reported as "net loss" when income is less than zero.

The net profit or loss is determined by:

Sales (revenue) – cost of goods sold – selling, general, administrative expenses (SGA) – depreciation/amortization = earnings before interest and taxes (EBIT) – interest and tax expenses = profit/loss

=== Balance sheet ===
The balance sheet is the financial statement showing a firm's assets, liabilities and equity (capital) at a set point in time, usually the end of the fiscal year reported on the accompanying income statement. The total assets always equal the total combined liabilities and equity. This statement best demonstrates the basic accounting equation:

Assets = Liabilities + Equity

Accounting standards often set out a general format that companies are expected to follow when presenting their balance sheets. International Financial Reporting Standards (IFRS) normally require that companies report current assets and liabilities separately from non-current amounts. A GAAP-compliant balance sheet must list assets and liabilities based on decreasing liquidity, from most liquid to least liquid. As a result, current assets/liabilities are listed first followed by non-current assets/liabilities. However, an IFRS-compliant balance sheet must list assets/liabilities based on increasing liquidity, from least liquid to most liquid. As a result, non-current assets/liabilities are listed first followed by current assets/liabilities.

Owner's equity, sometimes referred to as net assets, is represented differently depending on the type of business ownership. Business ownership can be in the form of a sole proprietorship, partnership, or a corporation. For a corporation, the owner's equity portion usually shows common stock, and retained earnings (earnings kept in the company). Retained earnings come from the retained earnings statement, prepared prior to the balance sheet.

==== Statement of retained earnings (statement of changes in equity) ====
This statement is additional to the three main statements described above. It shows how the distribution of income and transfer of dividends affects the wealth of shareholders in the company. The concept of retained earnings means profits of previous years that are accumulated till current period. Basic proforma for this statement is as follows:

Retained earnings at the beginning of period + Net Income for the period - Dividends = Retained earnings at the end of period.

== See also ==
- Bookkeeping
- Constant item purchasing power accounting
- DIRTI 5
- Philosophy of accounting
