= Subledger =

Detailed record supporting a general ledger

The subledger, or subsidiary ledger, provides details behind entries in the general ledger used in accounting. The subledger shows detail for part of the accounting records such as property and equipment, prepaid expenses, etc. The detail would include such items as date the item was purchased or expense incurred, a description of the item, the original balance, and the net book value. The total of the subledger would match the line item amount on the general ledger. This corresponding line item in the general ledger is referred to as the controlling account. The subsidiary ledger balance is compared with its controlling account balance as part of the process of preparing a trial balance.

As part of an audit, a method of testing balances may include tracing individual acquisitions to the subsidiary ledger for amounts and descriptions. The objective of this test is to determine that the current-year acquisitions schedule agrees with related subledger amounts, and the total agrees with the general ledger.

Common subsidiary ledgers include accounts receivable, accounts payable, fixed asset and inventory ledgers. With the adoption of standards such as FASB ASC 350-60 and IAS 38 for digital assets, subsidiary ledgers have also been applied to cryptocurrency holdings.
