= Amatino Manucci =

Provider of the first account of double-entry bookkeeping

Amatino Manucci was an Italian merchant based in Nîmes, France in the late 13th century, whose work includes the earliest extant accounting of double-entry bookkeeping, although he is not credited for inventing this accounting technique.

Manucci kept the accounts for Giovanni Farolfi & Company, a merchant partnership based in Nîmes, France. Manucci was a partner for the Salon, South of France branch. The writing, entirely in Manucci's hand, is neat, legible, and mostly well-preserved. Financial records from 1299—1300 survive that he kept for the firm's branch in Salon, Provence. Although these records are incomplete, they show enough detail to be identified as double-entry bookkeeping. These details include the use of debits and credits and duality of entries. "No more is known of Amatino Manucci, than this ledger that he kept."
