= Real-time posting =

Real-time posting refers to a style of processing financial transactions by a bank in their core banking system. It is an alternative to the older Memo Posting style.

There are several characteristics that distinguish a real-time posting system:

1. Transactions appear to customers and staff as soon as the item is posted and does not need to be re-processed at night to create the hard post.
2. The available balances are always up-to-date with respect to all known items.
3. The order of posted items does not change as may sometimes happen in memo-post systems when the memos are deleted and re-processed.
4. Memo-posting systems often need to go off-line while the database is re-loaded to prepare for the next day's business. Real-time systems do not need that re-load window.

Sometimes real-time posting is thought to mean 'there is no batch'. This is not always the case. Real-time posting systems may still need to support batch processing. Batch processing is attractive for some processing as it is a cost-effective means to process large groups of items. Examples of those batches would be check (cheque) clearing files or payment exchange files.

Many banking systems that implement real-time posting are also built on top of database management systems which allows for the banking system to be more available, even continuously available. The database foundation also allows for multiple batch processes to occur concurrently with more flexibility than can be easily achieved with traditional memo-post systems. Also, the database allows concurrent batch and online processing. This doesn't mean that a database couldn't be used at the core of a memo-post systems, but it would not be commonly done.
