= Bookkeeping association =

Bookkeeping associations are founded to provide support and standards for the bookkeeping industry. This is achieved by creating common standards for the industry that bookkeepers can work towards and that allow the users of bookkeepers to know what level of knowledge a bookkeeper they hire has.

The definition of a bookkeeper is broad and wide and open to interpretation. Each country can have its own standards and anyone can call themselves a bookkeeper while not having any qualifications or knowledge of the industry. The method of obtaining a bookkeeping qualification vary. A person can to pay a fee and not have to sit exams, obtain a qualification based on your experience, sit examinations without supervision, or sit examinations fully supervised in an exam hall or in a computer environment training exam centre. In many countries there are competing bookkeeper associations, but their qualifications are achieved in different ways and their knowledge levels can be different.

Bookkeeping associations can provide help on bookkeeping issues, tax issues, legal issues and professional development for their members. They can also lobby on behalf of their members to help promote their interests. They can as a body promote the standards of bookkeeping and market the benefits of using a qualified bookkeeper.

== List of bookkeeping associations from around the world ==
Country	Body	By Unsupervised Exam	By Supervised Exam	By Experience	By Licence
Australia	Association of Accounting Technicians (Australia)	Yes	Yes	Yes	No
Australia	Institute of Certified Bookkeepers (Australia)	Yes	Yes	Yes	No
Canada	Canadian Bookkeepers Association	No	Yes	Yes	No
Canada	Institute of Professional Bookkeepers of Canada	No	Yes	Yes	No
Denmark	Foreningen Freelance Bogholdere	No	No	Yes	No
India	Institute of Certified Bookkeepers (India)	No	Yes	Yes	No
Ireland	Institute of Certified Bookkeepers	Yes	Yes	Yes	No
Ireland	Irish Bookkeepers Association	No	Yes	Yes	No
Israel	Israel Bookkeepers Association	No	Yes	Yes	No
New Zealand	NZ Qualified Bookkeepers Association	Yes	No	Yes	No
New Zealand	NZ Bookkeepers Association Inc	Yes	No	No	No
Nigeria	Association of Bookkeepers Nigeria	No	Yes	Yes	Yes
Norway	Norwegian Association of Authorised Accountants	No	Yes	No	No
South Africa	Institute of Certified Bookkeepers (South Africa)				
UK	Association of Accounting Technicians	No	Yes	Yes	No
UK	International Association of Book-keepers	No	Yes	Yes	No
UK	Institute of Certified Bookkeepers	Yes	Yes	Yes	No
USA	Institute of Certified Bookkeepers	Yes	Yes	Yes	No
USA	American Institute of Professional Bookkeepers	No	Yes	Yes	No

== Explanation of table headings ==
Country
The country the bookkeeping association represents. Where a bookkeeping association is represented in more than one country, there should be a separate entry for each country it represents.
Body
The full registered name of the bookkeeping association
By Unsupervised Exam
An exam where no independent verification is made that the exam was taken without help.
By Supervised Exam
An exam is taken and supervised by independent personnel
By Experience
The qualification is issued based on the experience of the person and no exam is taken. That person has provided the required evidence of their experience.
By Licence
The person buys the right to use a title identifying them as a bookkeeper but no evidence of experience or examinations is requested or required.
