= Institute of Accountants and Bookkeepers =

British non-profit organisation

- Abbreviation: IAB
- Formation: 1973
- Headquarters: 110 Bishopsgate, London, EC2N 4AY
- Region served: International
- Members: 704
- Chief Executive: Janet jack
- Website: www.iab.org.uk

The Institute of Accountants and Bookkeepers (IAB) was founded in the United Kingdom in 1973 and, as a non-profit organisation, in its early years focussed purely on being an international professional and examining body for bookkeepers.

== Organisation ==
The IAB offers financial and business skills for those starting or developing a small business. It also continues to develop and deliver courses in accounting and bookkeeping at various levels and subjects, claiming many thousands of members and students worldwide. The IAB is present in most parts of the world where UK accounting standards or Generally Accepted Accounting Principles GAAP are used. In 2012, the IAB claimed to have 4,000 students in India currently registered and/or preparing to take an IAB exam. In addition to students studying with colleges throughout the UK, it has students studying with the University of the West Indies, and in Brunei Darussalam, Singapore, Malaysia, Indonesia, Vietnam, Cambodia, Thailand, Russian Federation and other European Countries, Baltic States, Belarus, India and Sri Lanka. The Institute of Certified Bookkeepers in South Africa (ICB SA) graduates are recognised by the IAB.

Many colleges and universities, including the Open University, offer IAB qualification around the world. All links to international associates and the colleges or centres are shown at their website. It also offers the members in practice free entry in their directory.

In the UK, it also continues to work with HM Revenue and Customs (HMRC) in areas, including being its approved supervisory body for the Anti-Money Laundering & Financing of Terrorism Regulations 2017. The IAB has three main grades of membership: Associate (AIAB), Member (MIAB) and Fellow (FIAB) depending on the qualifications.

IAB involves itself regularly with the UK government and standard setting agencies, such as HMRC Employment Consultative Committee, the Financial Services Authority, Ofqual, The Financial Services Skill Council and the Small Firms Enterprise Development Initiative (SFEDI).

The IAB offers more than 20 qualifications from Level 1 to 4 of UK National Qualifications Framework. All these qualifications are regulated by Ofqual (the Office of Qualifications and Examinations Regulation in England. IAB centres with contracts with the Skills Funding Agency Skills Funding Agency and other UK government bodies, may find that they can obtain funding towards the provision of courses leading to IAB QCF qualifications.

== Professional Institute of the Year ==
The IAB has won the prestigious Professional Institute of the Year award from the BKN BookkeepingAwards.co.uk 3 years running The awards are voted for by bookkeepers, accountants, business owners and members of The Book-keepers Network & Forum (BKN) (http://www.book-keepers.org.uk/) and it is awarded to the most popular Professional Institute.

== See also ==
- Bookkeeping association
