= Momentum accounting and triple-entry bookkeeping =

Accountancy system

Momentum accounting and triple-entry bookkeeping is a theoretical accounting framework proposed by Japanese economist Yuji Ijiri. It was designed to address perceived limitations in double-entry bookkeeping. The system emphasizes the tracking of changes in account balances, particularly in revenue generation and cash flows. While double-entry records each transaction with two entries (typically a debit and a credit) on a specific date, momentum accounting recognizes changes in balances as key events. Momentum accounting introduces the concept of tracking the rate of change in financial variables over time, rather than static balances alone. Unlike double-entry bookkeeping, which captures transactions at a single point in time, momentum accounting emphasizes continuous financial flows and trends. Under this system, a consistent increase in revenue is recorded through an additional entry representing the rate of change, distinguishing it from other double-entry systems.

== Sources ==
- Blommaert, A.M.M. "Additional disclosure: triple-entry en momentum accounting: kwaliteitsverbetering van management accountingsystemen door het administreren van winstkrachten en winstsnelheden." Dissertation, Maastricht University, 1994, ISBN 90-207-2482-7.
- Blommaert, A.M.M. (1995). "Additional disclosure triple-entry and momentum accounting." The European Accounting Review, Vol. 4, No. 3, pp. 580–581.
- Blommaert, A.M.M. and Blommaert, J.M.J. (1990), "Drie-dimensionaal boekhouden II: Doeleinden en comptabele implementatie." Maandblad Bedrijfsadministratie en Bedrijfsorganisatie, No. 1116, pp. 46–52 (in Dutch).
- Blommaert, A.M.M. and Blommaert, J.M.J. (1990), "Drie-dimensionaal boekhouden I: Doeleinden en comptabele implementatie." Maandblad Bedrijfsadministratie en Bedrijfsorganisatie, No. 1117, pp. 82–90 (in Dutch).
- Sousa Ferreira, A.C. de, M.O. Morais, M.C. Silva and R.R. do Santaos (2009), "Integrated analysis in three dimensions: applying for a Brazilian case.", Revista de Informação Contábil, Vol. 3, No. 2, pp. 99–112.
- Fraser, I.A.M. (1993), "Triple-entry bookkeeping: a critique." Accounting and Business Research, Vol. 23, No. 90, pp. 151–158.
- Ijiri, Y. (1993), "Variance analysis and triple-entry bookkeeping." In: Yuji Ijiri (ed.), Creative and innovative approaches to the science of management. The IC2 Management and Management Science Series. Quorum Books, Westport, ISBN 0-89930-642-X, pp. 3–25.
- Ijiri, Y. (1988), "Momentum accounting and managerial goals on impulses.’ Management Science, Vol. 34, No. 2, pp. 160–166.
- Ijiri, Y. (1987), "Three postulates of momentum accounting.’ Accounting Horizons, Vol. 1, March, pp. 25–34.
- Ijiri, Y. (1986), "A framework for triple-entry bookkeeping." The Accounting Review, Vol. 61, No. 4, 1986, pp. 745–759.
- Ijiri, Y. (1984), "A reliability comparison of the measurement of wealth, income, and force." The Accounting Review, Vol. 59, No. 1, pp. 52–63.
- Yuji Ijiri, "Triple-entry bookkeeping and income momentum", Studies in Accounting Research, Vol. 18., American Accounting Association, Sarasota, 1982.
- Eric Melse, "Momentum Accounting for trends. Relevance, explanatory and predictive power of the framework of triple-entry bookkeeping and momentum accounting of Yuji Ijiri." VDM Verlag Dr. Müller, 2010, ISBN 978-3-639-16051-2.
- Eric Melse, "Accounting for trends. Relevance, explanatory and predictive power of the framework of triple-entry bookkeeping and momentum accounting of Yuji Ijiri." Dissertation, Maastricht University, 2008, ISBN 978-90-902210-5-2.
- Melse, E. (2008), Accounting in three dimensions. A case for momentum revisited. The Journal of Risk Finance, Vol. 9, No. 4, pp. 334–350
- Melse, E. (2005), Het verklarend en voorspellend vermogen van Momentum Accounting." Kwartaalschrift Economie. Tijdschrift voor algemeen- en bedrijfseconomische vraagstukken. Vol. 2, No. 4, 2005, pp. 343–371 (in Dutch).
- Melse, E. (2004), "Accounting in three dimensions. A case for momentum." Balance Sheet, Vol. 12, No. 1, pp. 31–36.
- Melse, E. (2004), "What color is your balance sheet?" Balance Sheet, Vol. 12, No. 4, 2004, pp. 17–32.
- Wagensveld, J. (1995), "The future of double-entry." Paper, regional conference of the Northern Accounting Group, British Accounting Association, Newcastle, UK, 13-4-1995. Published as: Ribes, Erasmus Universiteit, Rotterdam, 1995, ISBN 90-5086-215-2.
- Tuğrul Bozbey, "Çift Yanlı Kayıt Yönteminin Diferansiyel Temelleri Üzerine Dayanarak İkiden Çok Yanlı Kayıt Tutma Yönteminin Geliştirilmesi" (in Turkish) Dissertation, Selçuk University, 2006, (Dissertation no: 189419) (https://tez.yok.gov.tr/UlusalTezMerkezi/giris.jsp)

== Topics ==
- Melse, E. (2009-10-28), Triple Entry and Momentum Accounting (TEMA) – Video in Dutch. Masterclass.
- Melse, E. (2009-10-28), TEMA analysis of Lehman Brothers – Video in Dutch. Masterclass.
