= Account (bookkeeping) =

Central data structure in the practice of accounting

In bookkeeping, an account refers to assets, liabilities, income, expenses, and equity, as represented by individual ledger pages, to which changes in value are chronologically recorded with debit and credit entries. These entries, referred to as postings, become part of a book of final entry or ledger. Examples of common financial accounts are sales, accountsreceivable, mortgages, loans, PP&E, common stock, sales, services, wages and payroll.

A chart of accounts provides a listing of all financial accounts used by particular business, organization, or government agency.

The system of recording, verifying, and reporting such information is called accounting. Practitioners of accounting are called accountants.

== Classification of accounts ==
=== Based on nature ===
An account may be classified as real, personal or as a nominal account.

Type	Represent	Examples
Real	Physically tangibile in the world and certain intangible things not having any physical existence	Tangibles – Plant and Machinery, Furniture and Fixtures, Computers and Information processors, Cash accounts etc. Intangibles – Goodwill, Patents and Copyrights
Personal	Business and Legal entities, Bank accounts	Individuals, Partnership firms, Corporate entities, Nonprofit organizations, any local or statutory bodies including governments at country, state or local levels
Nominal	Temporary Income and Expense accounts for recognition of the implications of the financial transactions during each fiscal year until finalization of accounts at the end	Sales, Purchases, Electricity charges

Example: A sales account is opened for recording the sales of goods or services and at the end of the financial period the total sales are transferred to the revenue statement account (Profit and Loss Account or Income and Expenditure Account).

Similarly expenses during the financial period are recorded using the respective Expense accounts, which are also transferred to the revenue statement account. The net positive or negative balance (profit or loss) of the revenue statement account is transferred to reserves or capital account as the case may be.

=== Based on periodicity of flow ===
The classification of accounts into real, personal and nominal is based on their nature i.e. physical asset, liability, juristic entity or financial transaction.

The further classification of accounts is based on the periodicity of their inflows or outflows in the context of the fiscal year:

- Income is a short term inflow during the fiscal year.
- Expense is short term outflow during the fiscal year.
- An asset is a long term inflow with implications extending beyond the financial period and by the traditional view could represent unclaimed income. Alternatively, an asset could be valued at the present value of its future inflows.
- Liability is a long term outflow with implications extending beyond the financial period and by the traditional view could represent unamortised expense. Alternatively, a liability could be valued at the present value of future outflows.

Type of accounts	Long term inflows	Long term outflows	Short term inflows	Short term outflows
Real	Assets			
Personal	Assets	Liability		
Nominal			Incomes	Expenses

Items in accounts are classified into five broad groups, also known as the elements of the accounts:

- Asset, Liability, Equity, Revenue, Expense

The classification of equity as a distinctive element for classification of accounts is disputable on account of the "entity concept", since for the objective analysis of the financial results of any entity the external liabilities of the entity should not be distinguished from any contribution by the shareholders.

== See also ==
- Bookkeeping
- Chart of accounts
- Double-entry bookkeeping
