= Yuji Ijiri =

Japanese economist (1935–2017)

- Born: February 24, 1935; Kobe, Empire of Japan
- Died: January 18, 2017 (aged 81)
- Scientific career
- Fields: Accounting, Economics

Yuji Ijiri (Japanese: 井尻 雄士, romanized: Ijiri Yūji) (24 February 1935 – 18 January 2017) was a Japanese economist, accounting researcher and educator. He was the Robert M. Trueblood University Professor of Accounting and Economics at Carnegie Mellon University until his retirement on June 30, 2011. He is noted in economics and finance for his contributions to research on firm growth and the general field of mathematical economics, and in particular power laws in economics. In accounting, he is known for his proposal of triple-entry accounting.

At the age of 21 he became a Certified Public Accountant in Japan, and remains the youngest person to do so.

He died of natural causes on 18 January 2017.

== Education ==
Ijiri attended Nara High School of Commerce, during which he took a test that allowed him to take the CPA exam without a degree. In 1953, he passed the exam while continuing schooling at Doshisha Junior College. He also attained a law degree in 1953 from Ritsumeikan University. Attended graduate school at the University of Minnesota and graduated in 1960. Received a doctorate in 1963 from Carnegie Mellon University.

== Professional career ==
After completing his law degree, Ijiri worked with a small firm until he left to pursue a master's degree. After 1963, Ijiri went on to work as faculty at Stanford University, 1963–67 and later Carnegie Mellon University.

He was the author of 25 books and more than 200 articles in professional journals and of several monographs including Momentum Accounting and Triple-Entry Bookkeeping.

He served as president of the American Accounting Association in 1982-83.

He was inducted into the Accounting Hall of Fame in 1989.

In 2018 the annual "Yuji Ijiri Foundations of Accounting Lecture" was initiated. It rotates among five major accounting associations.

- 2018 – Japan Accounting Association, Professor Shizuki Saito (University of Tokyo)
- 2019 – American Accounting Association, Professor Sudipta Basu (Temple University)
- 2020 – postponed due to COVID-19
- 2021 – Canadian Academic Accounting Association, Paul Fischer (University of Pennsylvania)
- 2022 – Accounting and Finance Association of Australia and New Zealand, Professor Stephen Penman (Columbia University)

== Sources ==
- Blommaert, A. M. M. (1995). "Additional disclosure triple-entry and momentum accounting." The European Accounting Review, Vol. 4, No. 3, pp. 580–581.
- Blommaert, A. M. M. and Blommaert, J. M. J. (1990), "Drie-dimensionaal boekhouden II: Doeleinden en comptabele implementatie." Maandblad Bedrijfsadministratie en Bedrijfsorganisatie, No. 1116, pp. 46–52 (in Dutch).
- Blommaert, A. M. M. and Blommaert, J. M. J. (1990), "Drie-dimensionaal boekhouden I: Doeleinden en comptabele implementatie." Maandblad Bedrijfsadministratie en Bedrijfsorganisatie, No. 1117, pp. 82–90 (in Dutch).
- Fraser, I. A. M. (1993), "Triple-entry bookkeeping: a critique." Accounting and Business Research, Vol. 23, No. 90, pp. 151–158.
- Ijiri, Y. (1993), "Variance analysis a'nd triple-entry bookkeeping." In: Yuji Ijiri (ed.), Creative and innovative approaches to the science of management. The IC2 Management and Management Science Series. Quorum Books, Westport, ISBN 0-89930-642-X, pp. 3–25.
- Yuji Ijiri, "Momentum accounting and triple-entry bookkeeping: exploring the dynamic structure of accounting measurements", Studies in Accounting Research, Vol. 31, American Accounting Association, Sarasota, 1989.
- Ijiri, Y. (1988), "Momentum accounting and managerial goals on impulses". Management Science, Vol. 34, No. 2, pp. 160–166.
- Ijiri, Y. (1987), "Three postulates of momentum accounting". Accounting Horizons, Vol. 1, March, pp. 25–34.
- Ijiri, Y. (1986), "A framework for triple-entry bookkeeping." The Accounting Review, Vol. 61, No. 4, 1986, pp. 745–759.
- Ijiri, Y. (1984), "A reliability comparison of the measurement of wealth, income, and force." The Accounting Review, Vol. 59, No. 1, pp. 52–63.
- Yuji Ijiri, Triple-entry bookkeeping and income momentum, Studies in Accounting Research, Vol. 18, American Accounting Association, Sarasota, 1982.
- Eric Melse, "Accounting for trends. Relevance, explanatory and predictive power of the framework of triple-entry bookkeeping and momentum accounting of Yuji Ijiri". Dissertation, Maastricht University, 2008, ISBN 978-90-902210-5-2.
- Melse, E. (2008), "Accounting in three dimensions. A case for momentum revisited", The Journal of Risk Finance, Vol. 9, No. 4, pp. 334–350
- Melse, E. (2005), Het verklarend en voorspellend vermogen van Momentum Accounting", Kwartaalschrift Economie. Tijdschrift voor algemeen- en bedrijfseconomische vraagstukken. Vol. 2, No. 4, 2005, pp. 343–371 (in Dutch).
- Melse, E. (2004), "Accounting in three dimensions. A case for momentum." Balance Sheet, Vol. 12, No. 1, pp. 31–36.
- Melse, E. (2004), "What color is your balance sheet?", Balance Sheet, Vol. 12, No. 4, 2004, pp. 17–32.
- Wagensveld, J. (1995). "The Future of Double-entry: Presented at the Regional Conference of the Northern Accounting Group", British Accounting Association, Newcastle, UK, 13 September 1995. Erasmus Universiteit.

== Topics ==
- Melse, E. (2009), Lehmann Brothers: a Momentum Accounting example. Nyenrode Business Universiteit, Case Study.
- Melse, E. (2009), Exxon Mobil as Dow Jones Predictor Nyenrode Business Universiteit, Case Study.
