= Merdiban =

Islamic accounting method

Merdiban was an accounting method used by the Ottoman Empire, Abbasid Caliphate, and Ilkhanate, especially for recording tax payments and liabilities.

== Etymology ==
The word "Merdiban" is derived from merdiven, a word of Persian origin meaning "staircase" or "ladder". The Ottomans themselves generally called this method muhasebe usulü "method of accounting".

== History ==
Abbasid accounting techniques were inherited by the Ilkhanate and then the Ottoman Empire; spanning several centuries until modern double-entry accounting was adopted post-Tanzimat.

Merdiban originated in the Abbasid Caliphate; the first likely example has been found in an eighth-century government document. After the conquest of Baghdad by Mongol forces in 1258, many Persian and Arab officials were employed by the Ikhanate. As the Mongols lacked strong state institutions, local systems were adopted, including accounting techniques. For instance, the Abbasids had a kind of daily ledger called a Defter-ul Yevmiye; the Ilkhanate adopted the same kind of daily ledger but called it Ruznamce. (The later Ottoman ruznamçe was similar).

Ghazan (1295–1304) made fiscal reforms; these drove more detailed record-keeping and, hence, further development of accounting techniques. Centralised fiscal record-keeping was divided according to provinces, and each team reported to a katip (which roughly corresponds to "clerk") - the same title used in the Abbasid state. "Katip" continued to be used to describe Ottoman accountants, although their official title was halife. The Risale-i Felekiyye, written in 1363 by Abdullah bin Muhammad bin Kiya Al-Mazandarani, was a manual of accounting, and is an important source for modern historians. The technique set out in the Risale begins to resemble a crude early attempt at double-entry accounting, but there is little evidence that this influenced the development of modern double-entry accounting in Italy.

It is possible that other states used accounting systems based on merdiban, but documentary evidence is sparse.

== Method ==
In the Ottoman empire, accounting was not taught systematically in madrasahs or other schools; instead, it was taught on a master-apprentice basis in the workplace, especially the Hazine-i Amire (finance ministry). So, few instruction documents survive from this era.

Merdiban was named because of the descending sequence in which amounts were recorded; a total at the top, and then individual items below. Typically, the last letter of the first word in an entry would be extended all the way across a line from left to right, acting as a separator between entries.

Mediban was usually recorded in siyakat script; a specialised and condensed form of text, almost stenographic, which was used where much of the content was numerical. Siyakat was so widely associated with accounting and fiscal documents that it became a synonym.
