= Desi Namu =

Accounting system

Desi Nama (Hindi: देसी नामा, romanized: desi nama, lit. 'Indian bend' also: "Jama Nama" - from Persian Jam` Nama meaning "Summing Book") or Vahi Paddhati (Hindi: वहीपद्धति, romanized: vahi paddhati, lit. 'book method') is the traditional accounting system developed and used in the Indian subcontinent. Early forms of this system were reportedly used in India before the double entry book keeping system was developed in Europe (13th century).

== History ==
=== Early mentions/colonial times ===
Various books have been written on desi namu from the late 1800s to the 1900s in regional languages.

==== Adoption of western calendar ====
In earlier times desi namu was recorded according Vikram Samvat calendar but now it is recorded according to the financial year.

== Accounting technique ==
=== Debiting and crediting ===
The sides are reversed images of those used in double entry system. The left-hand side is known as ‘Jama' (Credit) and the right-hand side is known as 'Udhar' (Debit).

The first fold (sals) on each side is used for recording the amount and the remaining three are meant for recording the details of the transaction.

The posting from Rojmel or BethoMel is on the same side of the Ledger. e.g. A has paid Rupees 500. This will be recorded on the Jama side of Rojmel. In the Khatavahi (Ledger) also, this would be recorded on the Jama side of A's Account.

In the Khatavahi under Desi Nama only the amount, the Rojmel Pan (folio) number and the tithi (date) are written. No details about the transactions are given.

=== Account categories ===
Accounts are generally divided into three categories: Personal, real and nominal.

==== Personal accounts ====
1. The account of a person who gets the benefit from the business is debited.
2. the account of a person who gives the benefit to the business is credited.

==== Real accounts ====
1. When goods or assets come in the business they are Debited.
2. When goods or assets go out of business they are Credited.

==== Nominal accounts ====
1. Incomes or gains or profits of the business are credited.
2. Expenses or losses occurred in business are debited.

=== Types of account books ===
Traditional Indian bookkeeping knows many different types of accounts. The following is non-exhaustive list of some important or notable types. The word Shri is used as an honorific before many account names, e.g. Shri Bhada Khatun (Rent Account).

==== Main ledger ====
Hindi: Khatavahi

==== Journal / Original entry ====
Hindi: Rojmel This book resembles the western style journal but as far as the balance is concerned, it is a Cash Book of the Double Entry System.

==== Capital account ====
Hindi: Bhandol Khatun In case of partnerships, a capital account of each partner is opened and the amount contributed by a partner is credited to his Capital Account.

==== Branch office account ====
Hindi: Deshavar Khatun When the owner of a business or his salesman, munim, or any other employee travels out of station (deshavar), a lump sum is given to him for expenses. This amount is not debited to his personal account, but is debited to Desawar Account.

==== Disbursements ====
Hindi: Dukan Kharch Khatun Small traders debit small expenses of the business to this type of accounts, e.g. postage, stationery, tea and drinks, Muhurt expenses etc. However, in large businesses separate accounts are maintained for such expenses.

==== Drawings account ====
Hindi: Shri Ghar-Kharch Khatun Any amount spent for personal expenses of the proprietor is debited to this.

==== Anonymous payments ====
Hindi: Shah Khatun or Hindi: Shree Khatun When an amount is received or paid to someone whose name is not to be disclosed, then the amount is debited or credited to "Shah Khate". Similarly when an amount is paid to or received from someone and their name is forgotten, the same in debited or credited to Shree Khate and when the name is remembered, the name of the person is inserted in the blank space.

=== Timekeeping ===
Desi Namu system uses months and year of Vikram Samvat which comprises the twelve-month period from Kartik to Aso. Even in this system, the dates according to English calendar are written. (According to Income Tax Law in India, all accounts must be closed annually on 31 March. Hence traders keeping books under Desi Nama also keep their accounting year from 1 April to 31 March now.)

== Comparison to western systems ==
Leaves (pages) can be added or removed as required. This is appropriate for small traders. They can get the benefit of double entry system by making minor changes. Alas, this means that anybody can tamper with them. Hence the bound books with page numbers used in double entry must be used in desi nama also.

There is no system of columnar book-keeping. Where various items are dealt in, it is convenient to have columnar books. e.g. if a person deals in hosiery and cutlery, it will be convenient to have two columns in Jama Nondh for recording separate purchases of these two items.

Vouchers for all transactions are not systematically filed and maintained nor entered into the main ledger (Khatavahi). This makes a detailed audit trail impossible.

It fails to satisfy the requirements of modern times. Particularly, it is not useful for decision-making in modern big business units.

No	Points of Difference	Desi Namu System	Double Entry System
1	books	Books are long, bound in the middle with string, folded and blank.	Books are hard bound horizontal and are ruled.
2	Sides	The left side is called jama and right side is called udhar	The left side is called debit (udhar) and right side is called credit (jama).
3	Ink	Generally, books are written with black ink. Nowadays blue ink is also used.	Books are written in blue in ink. However, red ink is used for some special figures.
4	Books of original entry	Rojmel is the book of original entry. In which daily transactions are recorded.	Journal entry is the book of original entry.
5	Amount	The amounts are generally written in the first folds on both the sides.	The amount is generally written in the last columns.
6	Posting	While posting entries from rojmel to Khatavahi, items of jama side of rojmel are posted on the jama side of the Khatavahi and similarly udhar side is posted to the udhar side of the account.	The entries from debit side of the cash book are posted to the credit side of ledger and from the credit side it is posted to the debit side of the ledger.
7	Country of origin	This system is developed in India.	This system was developed in Italy from where it spread in other countries of Europe.
8	Accounting year	Generally, Vikram Samvat is used as accounting year.	Generally, English year A.D. is used as accounting year.

== Contemporary use ==
=== India ===
western India [Gujarat, Rajasthan etc.]

== Materials ==
=== Books ===
Books are usually covered with red cloth and are hard-bound. Traditionally the transaction lines are entered parallel to the binding. The books in Desi Nama are usually long, double folded and tied with a thick string. The papers are blank, i.e. not ruled. However, in modern times, books of accounts with lined pages are also in use. Most of the traders keep the first page for worshiping their Gods e.g. Shri Ganeshay Namah or Mahalaxmi Matani Maher Hajo.

==== Page folding ====
Each leaf is folded into eight folds. The first four folds are used for jama and the last four folds (Sals) are used for Udhar. Sometimes a leaf is folded into six folds, three on each side meant for Jama and Udhar respectively. Generally, in case of subsidiary books, six folds are kept.

==== Ink ====
It was the practice to write accounts in black ink only, but now blue ink has become common.
