= Closing entries =

Accounting term

Closing entries are journal entries made at the end of an accounting period to transfer temporary accounts to permanent accounts. An "income summary" account may be used to show the balance between revenue and expenses, or they could be directly closed against retained earnings where dividend payments will be deducted from. This process is used to reset the balance of these temporary accounts to zero for the next accounting period.
