= Normal balance =

Notational convention in accounting

In accounting, the normal balance of an account is the type of net balance that it should have.

Any particular account contains debit and credit entries. The account's net balance is the difference between the total of the debits and the total of the credits. This can be a net debit balance when the total debits are greater, or a net credit balance when the total credits are greater. By convention, one of these is the normal balance type for each account according to its category. Asset and expense accounts have a normal debit balance, while liability, equity and income accounts have a normal credit balance. Generally a normal balance is shown in statements as a positive number. In the case of a contra account, however, the normal balance convention is reversed and a normal balance is reported either as a negative number, or alongside its parent balance as an amount subtracted.

An abnormal balance often indicates an accounting error. Cash on hand should never have a net credit balance, since one cannot credit (pay from) cash what has not been debited (paid in). Similarly, if a liability account happens to be overpaid, it would be incorrect to continue reporting it as a liability with a debit balance because it no longer represents an amount owed. It would properly be reported as an asset, and possibly written off to a zero balance if the overpayment is not recoverable.
