= Institute of Certified Bookkeepers =

Bookkeeping trade organization

ICB
- Institute of Certified Bookkeepers
- Formation: November 1996
- Type: Not-for-profit
- Purpose: Promote the bookkeeping profession
- Location: United Kingdom
- Members: 150,000 students
- Website: www.icb.org.au/s

The Institute of Certified Bookkeepers ("ICB") is a British not-for-profit organization. Its objective is to promote the bookkeeping profession worldwide and offer its students and members trusted bookkeeping qualifications. Founded in the United Kingdom in November 1996, ICB has grown to be the largest bookkeeping body in the world today with over 150,000 members, including students, from over 100 countries.

== Global presence ==
Since its inception in the UK, ICB has set up International offices and agents in 19 other countries. It has had offices in Australia since 2002, offices in Russia and other countries in eastern Europe and central Asia (trading as ICFM) since 2006, in Ghana since 2009, in India since 2010, and in Ireland since 2013.

== Membership ==
Bookkeepers with suitable previous qualifications or experience, as well as those without prior knowledge can become a member of ICB. The latter can join as students and take a course with an ICB-accredited Training Provider, or learn through self-study using ICB textbooks, and then upgrade after passing ICB exams. Members have access to a range of benefits, including regular Continuing professional development (CPD) events, technical advice line and web resources, a membership card and certificate, career and business start-up advice, and an online job vacancy facility.

== Money laundering supervision ==
ICB has been an HMT-appointed Money Laundering Supervisor since the UK Money laundering Regulations Act of 2007 came into force. The act requires all bookkeeping practices to be supervised by such a body. ICB automatically covers all of its members who take out an ICB Practice License. Over 3,000 bookkeeping practices in the UK are supervised by ICB.

In 2025 ICB was censured by the Financial Conduct Authority for serious failings relating to supervision of anti-money laundering compliance by its members in 2022 and 2023, especially for ICB's suspending all inspections of its members for nine months.

== Annual events ==
In 2009, ICB established its annual Bookkeepers Summit, a conference of ICB students and members, and the LUCA awards, its annual awards dinner, which takes place each year in London. The summit is attended by hundreds of ICB students and members. Guests attend talks covering a range of industry-related topics and have the opportunity to network with fellow bookkeepers. The annual LUCA Awards were created to recognize bookkeeping, study, and training excellence. They are attended by nominated ICB students, members, and partners from the UK and around the world.

In 2013, ICB launched its National Bookkeeping Week; a week of events held across the country for the purpose of raising the profile of bookkeeping as a profession and recognizing its importance to businesses.

== Partners ==
ICB has had a strategic partnership with Sage software for several years, and has partnered with several additional software providers, including Intuit, Big Red Cloud, ClearBooks, AE Comply, and Receipt Bank, since then. ICB also partnered with Startup Loans in 2013, to give further support to small businesses and emphasize to them the importance of good bookkeeping.
