= Liability (accounting) =

Value that a financial entity owes

In accounting, a liability is a quantity of value that a financial entity owes. More technically, it is value that an entity is expected to deliver in the future to satisfy a present obligation arising from past events. The value delivered to settle a liability may be in the form of assets transferred or services performed.

== Characteristics ==
A liability is defined by the following characteristics:

- Any type of borrowing from persons or banks for improving a business or personal income that is payable during short or long time;
- A duty or responsibility to others that entails settlement by future transfer or use of assets, provision of services, or other transaction yielding an economic benefit, at a specified or determinable date, on occurrence of a specified event, or on demand;
- A duty or responsibility that obligates the entity to another, leaving it little or no discretion to avoid settlement; and,
- A transaction or event obligating the entity that has already occurred

Liabilities in financial accounting need not be legally enforceable; but can be based on equitable obligations or constructive obligations. An equitable obligation is a duty based on ethical or moral considerations. A constructive obligation is an obligation that is implied by a set of circumstances in a particular situation, as opposed to a contractually based obligation.

The accounting equation relates assets, liabilities, and owner's equity:

Assets = Liabilities + Owner's Equity

The accounting equation is the mathematical structure of the balance sheet.

Probably the most accepted accounting definition of liability is the one used by the International Accounting Standards Board (IASB). The following is a quotation from IFRS Framework:

A liability is a present obligation of the enterprise arising from past events, the settlement of which is expected to result in an outflow from the enterprise of resources embodying economic benefits

— F.49(b)

Regulations as to the recognition of liabilities are different all over the world, but are roughly similar to those of the IASB.

Examples of types of liabilities include: money owing on a loan, money owing on a mortgage, or an IOU.

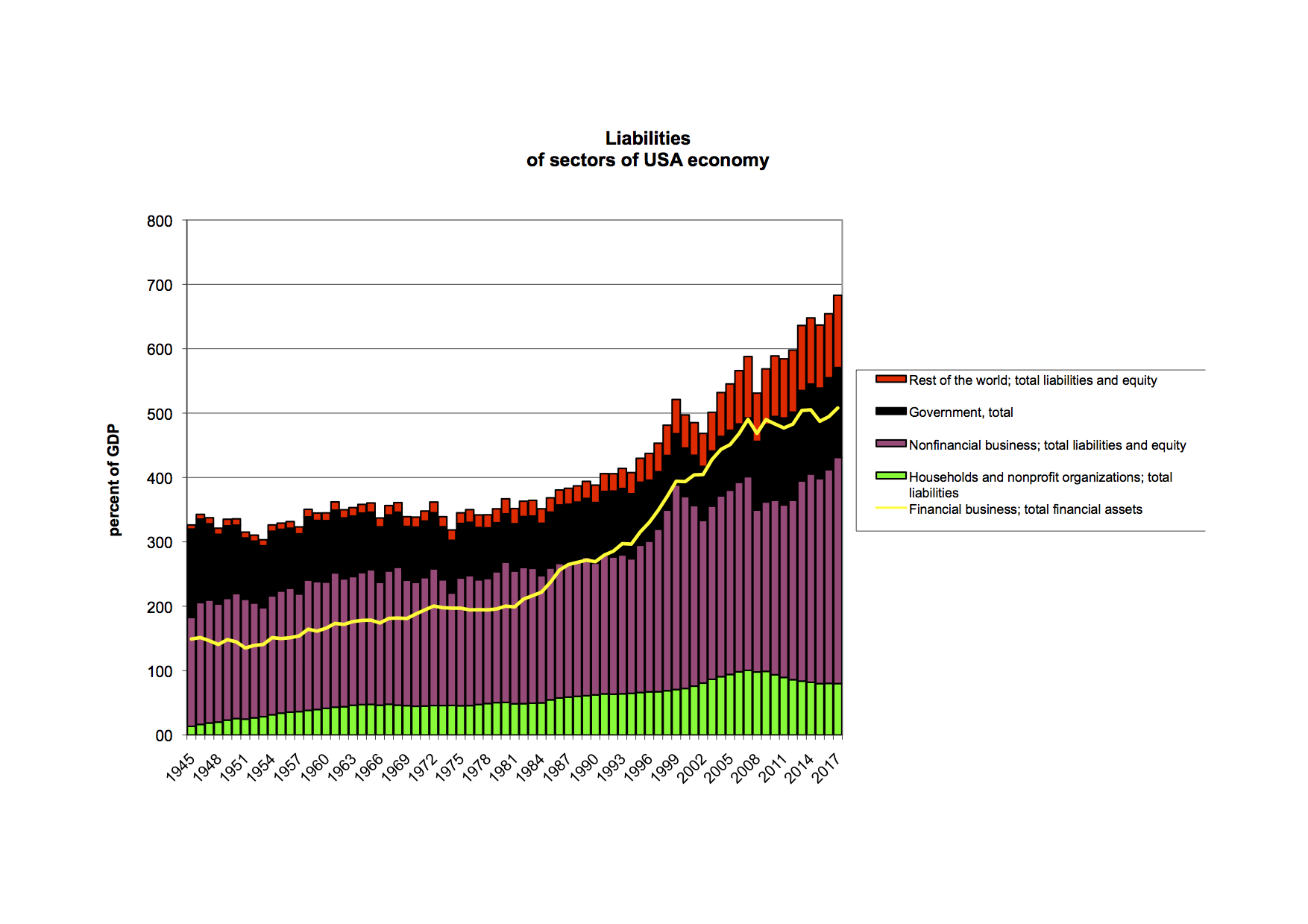
Liabilities of sectors of USA economy, 1945-2017, based on flow of funds statistics of the Federal Reserve System

Liabilities are debts and obligations of the business they represent as creditor's claim on business assets.

== Classification ==
Liabilities are reported on a balance sheet and are usually divided into two categories:

- Current liabilities – these liabilities are reasonably expected to be liquidated within a year. They usually include payables such as wages, accounts, taxes, and accounts payable, unearned revenue when adjusting entries, portions of long-term bonds to be paid this year, and short-term obligations (e.g. from purchase of equipment). Current liabilities are obligations whose liquidation is reasonably expected to require the use of current assets, the creation of other current liabilities, or the provision of services within the next year or operating cycle, whichever is longer.
- Long-term liabilities – these liabilities are reasonably expected not to be liquidated within a year. They usually include issued long-term bonds, notes payable, long-term leases, pension obligations, and long-term product warranties.

Liabilities of uncertain value or timing are called provisions.

When a company deposits cash with a bank, the bank records a liability on its balance sheet, representing the obligation to repay the depositor, usually on demand. Simultaneously, in accordance with the double-entry principle, the bank records the cash, itself, as an asset. The company, on the other hand, upon depositing the cash with the bank, records a decrease in its cash and a corresponding increase in its bank deposits (an asset).

== Debits and credits ==
A debit either increases an asset or decreases a liability; a credit either decreases an asset or increases a liability. According to the principle of double-entry, every financial transaction corresponds to both a debit and a credit.

When cash is deposited in a bank, the bank is said to "debit" its cash account, on the asset side, and "credit" its deposits account, on the liabilities side. In this case, the bank is debiting an asset and crediting a liability, which means that both increase.

When cash is withdrawn from a bank, the opposite happens: the bank "credits" its cash account and "debits" its deposits account. In this case, the bank is crediting an asset and debiting a liability, which means that both decrease.

== See also ==
- Asset
- Cost
- Contingent liability
- Depreciation
- Financial accounting
- Overhead (business)
