= General ledger =

Bookkeeping (accounting) record

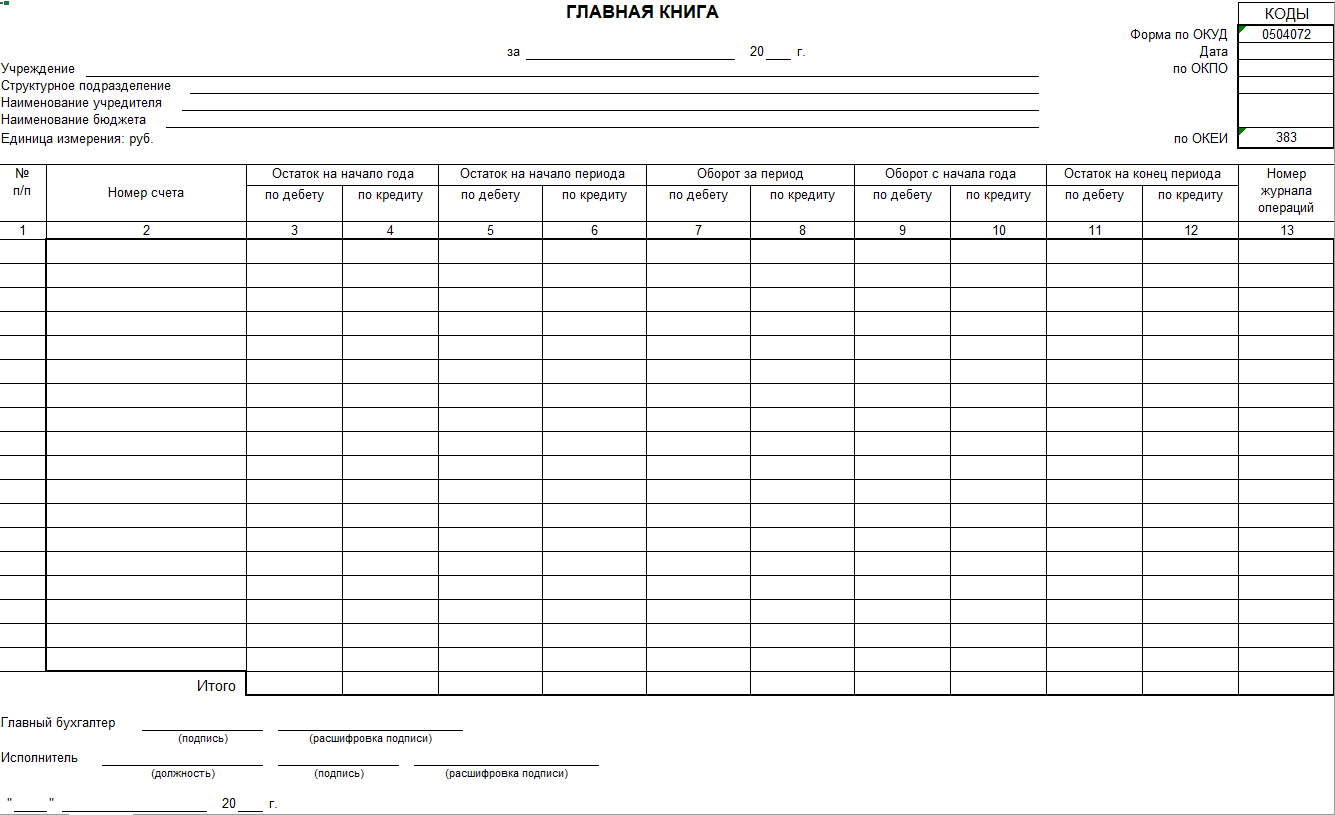
Sample Ledger book

In bookkeeping, a general ledger is a bookkeeping ledger in which accounting data are posted from journals and aggregated from subledgers, such as accounts payable, accounts receivable, cash management, fixed assets, purchasing and projects. A general ledger may be maintained on paper, on a computer, or in the cloud. A ledger account is created for each account in the chart of accounts for an organization and is classified into account categories, such as income, expense, assets, liabilities, and equity; the collection of all these accounts is known as the general ledger. The general ledger holds financial and non-financial data for an organization. Each account in the general ledger consists of one or more pages. It includes details such as the date of sale, invoice number, customer details, and the amount due. This ledger helps businesses track outstanding receivables and manage cash flow efficiently. An organization's statement of financial position and the income statement are both derived from income and expense account categories in the general ledger.

== Terminology ==
The general ledger contains a page for all accounts in the chart of accounts arranged by account categories. The general ledger is usually divided into at least seven main categories: assets, liabilities, owner's equity, revenue, expenses, gains and losses. It is the system of record for an organization’s financial transactions. The main categories of the general ledger may be further subdivided into subledgers to include additional details of such accounts as cash, accounts receivable, accounts payable, etc.

The extraction of account balances is called a trial balance. The purpose of the trial balance is, at a preliminary stage of the financial statement preparation process, to ensure the equality of the total debits and credits.

== Process ==
Posting is the process of recording amounts as credits (right side), and amounts as debits (left side), in the pages of the general ledger. Additional columns to the right hold a running activity total (similar to a chequebook).

The general ledger should include the date, description and balance or total amount for each account.

Because each bookkeeping entry debits one account and credits another account in an equal amount, the double-entry bookkeeping system helps ensure that the general ledger is always in balance, thus maintaining the accounting equation:

Assets = Liabilities + (Shareholder's or Owner's equity).

The accounting equation is the mathematical structure of the balance sheet. Although a general ledger appears to be fairly simple, in large or complex organizations or organizations with various subsidiaries, the general ledger can grow to be quite large and take several hours or days to audit or balance. In a manual or non-computerized system, the general ledger may be a large book. Organizations may instead employ one or more spreadsheets for their ledgers, including the general ledger, or may utilize specialized software to automate ledger entry and handling. When a business uses enterprise resource planning (ERP) software, a financial-features module produces subledgers and the general ledger, with entries drawn from a database that is shared with other processes managed through the ERP.
