= Balance (accounting) =

Amount of money owed on an account

In banking and accounting, the balance is the amount of money owed (or due) on an account.

In bookkeeping, "balance" is the difference between the sum of debit entries and the sum of credit entries entered into an account during a financial period. When total debits exceed the total credits, the account indicates a debit balance. The opposite is true when the total credit exceeds total debits, the account indicates a credit balance. If the debit/credit totals are equal, the balances are considered zeroed out. In an accounting period, "balance" reflects the net value of assets and liabilities to better understand balance in the accounting equation.

Balancing the books refers to the primary balance sheet equation of:

Assets = liabilities + owners equity (capital)

The first "balancing" of books, or the balance sheet financial statement in accounting is to check iterations (trial balance) to be sure the equation above applies, and where assets and liabilities are unequal, to equalize them by debiting or crediting owner's equity (i.e. if assets exceed liabilities, equity is increased, if liabilities exceed assets, equity is decreased, both in the amount needed to balance the equation).

In addition to the balance sheet, the other primary financial statement (the P&L or Profit and Loss Statement) also is balanced against the balance sheet, generally by the use of a "plug" such as imputed interest.
