= Accounting equation =

Fundamental equation relating accounting quantities

The fundamental accounting equation, also called the balance sheet equation, is the foundation for the double-entry bookkeeping system and the cornerstone of accounting science. Like any equation, each side will always be equal. In the accounting equation, every transaction will have a debit and credit entry, and the total debits (left side) will equal the total credits (right side). In other words, the accounting equation will always be "in balance".

== The equation ==
The equation can take various forms, including:

- $A = L + E$ (i.e. $\text{Assets} = \text{Liabilities} + \text{Equity}$)
- $A = OE + L$ (i.e. $\text{Assets} = \text{Liabilities} + \text{Owner’s Equity}$)
- $A = SE + L$ (i.e. $\text{Assets} = \text{Shareholders’ Equity} + \text{Liabilities}$)

The formula can also be rearranged, e.g.:

- $A - L = OE$ (i.e. $\text{Assets} - \text{Liabilities} = \text{Owner’s Equity}$)
- $A - L = SE$ (i.e. $\text{Assets} - \text{Liabilities} = \text{Shareholders’ Equity}$)

According to class 11 NCERT Accountancy books published by the CBSE it is written as:

- $Assets = Liabilities + Capital$

For Current Assets as :

- $Current\ Assets = Current\ Liabilities + Working\ Capital$

For finding total Assets through the Assets method:

- $\text{Total Assets} = \text{Equity} + \text{Total Liabilities}$

For finding total Assets through Assets method:

- $\text{Total Assets} = \text{Current Assets} + \text{Non-Current Assets}$

To find the Equity of Total Assets:

- $\text{Equity} = \text{Share Capital} + \text{Retained Earnings} + \text{Reserves} - \text{Treasury Stock}$

To find out Total liabilities of Total Assets:

- $\text{Total Liabilities} = \text{Current Liabilities} + \text{Non-Current Liabilities}$

To find out the Total Assets through Liability method:

- $\text{Total Assets} = \text{Equity} + \text{Total Liabilities}$

Every accounting transaction affects at least one element of the equation, but always balances. Simple transactions also include:

Transaction Number	Assets		Liabilities		Equity		Explanation
1	+	6,000			+	6,000	Issuing capital stock for cash or other assets
2	+	10,000	+	10,000			Buying assets by borrowing money (taking a loan from a bank or simply buying on credit)
3	−	900	−	900			Selling assets for cash to pay off liabilities: both assets and liabilities are reduced
4	+	1,000	+	400	+	600	Buying assets by paying cash by shareholder's money (600) and by borrowing money (400)
5	+	700			+	700	Earning revenues
6	−	200			−	200	Paying expenses (e.g. rent or professional fees) or dividends
7			+	100	−	100	Recording expenses, but not paying them at the moment
8	−	500	−	500			Paying a debt that you owe
9		0		0		0	Receiving cash for sale of an asset: one asset is exchanged for another; no change in assets or liabilities

These are some simple examples, but even the most complicated transactions can be recorded in a similar way. This equation is behind debits, credits, and journal entries.

This equation is part of the transaction analysis model, for which we also write

Owner's equity = Contributed Capital + Retained Earnings

Retained Earnings = Net Income − Dividends

and

Net Income = Revenue − Expenses

The equation resulting from making these substitutions in the accounting equation may be referred to as the expanded accounting equation, because it yields the breakdown of the equity component of the equation.

Assets = Liabilities + Contributed Capital + Revenue − Expenses − Dividends

== Applications ==
The accounting equation is fundamental to the double-entry bookkeeping practice. Its applications in accountancy and economics are thus diverse.

=== Financial statements ===
A company's quarterly and annual reports are basically derived directly from the accounting equations used in bookkeeping practices. These equations, entered in a business's general ledger, will provide the material that eventually makes up the foundation of a business's financial statements. This includes expense reports, cash flow and salary and company investments.

=== Double entry bookkeeping system ===
The accounting equation plays a significant role as the foundation of the double-entry bookkeeping system. The primary aim of the double-entry system is to keep track of debits and credits and ensure that the sum of these always matches up to the company assets, a calculation carried out by the accounting equation. It is based on the idea that each transaction has an equal effect. It is used to transfer totals from books of prime entry into the nominal ledger. Every transaction is recorded twice so that the debit is balanced by a credit.

=== Income and retained earnings ===
The income and retained earnings of the accounting equation is also an essential component in computing, understanding, and analyzing a firm's income statement. This statement reflects profits and losses that are themselves determined by the calculations that make up the basic accounting equation. In other words, this equation allows businesses to determine revenue as well as prepare a statement of retained earnings. This then allows them to predict future profit trends and adjust business practices accordingly. Thus, the accounting equation is an essential step in determining company profitability.

=== Company worth ===
Since the balance sheet is founded on the principles of the accounting equation, this equation can also be said to be responsible for estimating the net worth of an entire company. The fundamental components of the accounting equation include the calculation of both company holdings and company debts; thus, it allows owners to gauge the total value of a firm's assets.

However, because accounting is kept on a historical basis, the equity is typically not the net worth of the organization. Often, a company may depreciate capital assets in 5–7 years, meaning that the assets will show on the books as less than their "real" value, or what they would be worth on the secondary market.

==== Investments ====
Due to its role in determining a firm's net worth, the accounting equation is an important tool for investors looking to measure a company's holdings and debts at any particular time, and frequent calculations can indicate how steady or erratic a business's financial dealings might be. This provides valuable information to creditors or banks that might be considering a loan application or investment in the company.

== See also ==
- Accounting identity
