= Trial balance =

List of all business accounts in a ledger

A trial balance is an internal financial statement that lists the adjusted closing balances of all the general ledger accounts (both revenue and capital) contained in the ledger of a business as at a specific date. This list will contain the name of each nominal ledger account in the order of liquidity and the value of that nominal ledger balance. Each nominal ledger account will hold either a debit balance or a credit balance. The debit balance values will be listed in the debit column of the trial balance and the credit value balance will be listed in the credit column. The trading profit and loss statement and balance sheet and other financial reports can then be produced using the ledger accounts listed on the same balance.

== History ==
The first published description of the function is found in Luca Pacioli's 1494 work Summa de arithmetica, in the section titled Particularis de Computis et Scripturis. Although he did not use the term, he essentially prescribed a technique similar to a post-closing trial balance.

== Usage ==
The primary purpose of preparing a trial balance is to ensure the accuracy of an entity's double-entry bookkeeping system. Accounting equation rule states that there must be equal debit and credit for every financial transaction, therefore, the value of all the debit and credit balances on trial balance must be equal. If the total of the debit column does not equal the total value of the credit column, then this would show that there is an error in the nominal ledger accounts. This error must be found before a profit and loss statement and balance sheet can be produced. Hence, trial balance is important in case of adjustments. Whenever any adjustment is performed, trial balance should be performed and it should be confirmed whether all the debit amount is equal to credit amount.

The trial balance is usually prepared by a bookkeeper or accountant who has used daybooks to record financial transactions and then post them to the nominal ledgers and personal ledger accounts. The trial balance is a part of the double-entry bookkeeping system and uses the classic 'T' account format for presenting values.

== Normal Balances ==
Normal Balances refer to whether the balance for an account in a properly-formed trial balance is usually a debt or a credit. A normal balance also reflects the accounting equation. If a trial balance for an account is reversed, such an account is called a "contra-account" (e.g. accumulated depreciation as an asset or owners drawings as equity). The normal balances are as follow:

Normal Balance
Debit	Credit
Assets	
	Liabilities
	Equity
Owner's Drawing	
	Retained Earnings
	Revenue
Expenses	

The sum total of each column should be equal, or "balance." The act of "closing the books" refers to zeroing out all the revenue and expense amounts at the end of an accounting period (typically a fiscal year) and adding the difference to the retained earnings account. This is called a "closing entry." If the company earned a profit, the retained earnings account will be increased. If the company experienced a loss, the retained earnings account will be reduced. The resulting opening balance for the new accounting period will still have columns of equal sum totals.

== Limitations ==
A trial balance only checks the sum of debits against the sum of credits. That is why it does not guarantee that there are no errors. The following are the main classes of errors that are not detected by the trial balance.

- An error of original entry is when both sides of a transaction include the wrong amount. For example, if a purchase invoice for £21 is entered as £12, this will result in an incorrect debit entry (to purchases), and an incorrect credit entry (to the relevant creditor account), both for £9 less, so the total of both columns will be £9 less, and will thus balance.
- An error of omission is when a transaction is completely omitted from the accounting records. As the debits and credits for the transaction would balance, omitting it would still leave the totals balanced. A variation of this error is omitting one of the ledger account totals from the trial balance (but in this case the trial balance will not balance).
- An error of reversal is when entries are made to the correct amount, but with debits instead of credits, and vice versa. For example, if a cash sale for £100 is debited to the Sales account, and credited to the Cash account. Such an error will not affect the totals. An error of reversal may occasionally be detected if the trial balance is not a normal balance - such as cash having a credit balance.
- An error of commission is when the entries are made at the correct amount, and the appropriate side (debit or credit), but one or more entries are made to the wrong account of the correct type. For example, if fuel costs are incorrectly debited to the postage account (both expense accounts). This will not affect the totals. This can also occur due to confusion in revenue and capital expenditure.
- An error of principle is when the entries are made to the correct amount, and the appropriate side (debit or credit), as with an error of commission, but the wrong type of account is used. For example, if fuel costs (an expense account), are debited to stock (an asset account). This will not affect the totals.
- Compensating errors are multiple unrelated errors that would individually lead to an imbalance, but together cancel each other out.
