= Debits and credits =

Sides of an account in double-entry bookkeeping

Debits and credits in double-entry bookkeeping are entries made in account ledgers to record changes in value resulting from business transactions. A debit entry in an account represents a transfer of value to that account, and a credit entry represents a transfer from the account. Each transaction transfers value from credited accounts to debited accounts. For example, a tenant who writes a rent cheque to a landlord would enter a credit for the bank account on which the cheque is drawn, and a debit in a rent expense account. Similarly, the landlord would enter a credit in the rent income account associated with the tenant and a debit for the bank account where the cheque is deposited.

Debits increase the value of assets and expense accounts and reduce the value of liabilities, equity, and revenue accounts. Conversely, credits increase the value of liability, equity, and revenue accounts and reduce the value of asset and expense accounts.

Debits and credits are traditionally distinguished by writing the transfer amounts in separate columns of an account book. This practice simplified the manual calculation of net balances before the introduction of computers; each column was added separately, and then the smaller total was subtracted from the larger. Alternatively, debits and credits can be listed in one column, indicating debits with the suffix "Dr" or writing them plain, and indicating credits with the suffix "Cr" or a minus sign. Debits and credits do not, however, correspond in a fixed way to positive and negative numbers. Instead the correspondence depends on the normal balance convention of the particular account.

== History ==
The modern double entry system was likely a direct precursor of the first European adaptation many centuries later. The first known use of the terms "debit" and "credit" occurred in the Venetian Luca Pacioli's 1494 work, Summa de Arithmetica, Geometria, Proportioni et Proportionalita (A Summary of Arithmetic, Geometry, Proportions and Proportionality). Pacioli devoted one section of his book to documenting and describing the double-entry bookkeeping system in use during the Renaissance by Venetian merchants, traders and bankers. This system is still the fundamental system in use by modern bookkeepers.

It is sometimes said that, in its original Latin, Pacioli's Summa used the Latin words debere (to owe) and credere (to entrust) to describe the two sides of a closed accounting transaction. Assets were owed to the owner and the owners' equity was entrusted to the company. At the time negative numbers were not in use. When his work was translated, the Latin words debere and credere became the English debit and credit. Under this theory, the abbreviations Dr (for debit) and Cr (for credit) derive directly from the original Latin. However, Sherman casts doubt on this idea because Pacioli uses Per (Italian for "by") for the debtor and A (Italian for "to") for the creditor in the Journal entries. Sherman goes on to say that the earliest text he found that actually uses "Dr." as an abbreviation in this context was an English text, the third edition (1633) of Ralph Handson's book Analysis or Resolution of Merchant Accompts and that Handson uses Dr. as an abbreviation for the English word "debtor" (Sherman could not locate a first edition, but speculates that it too used Dr. for debtor). The words actually used by Pacioli for the left and right sides of the Ledger are "in dare" and "in havere" (give and receive). Geijsbeek the translator suggests in the preface:

[I]f we today would abolish the use of the words debit and credit in the ledger and substitute the ancient terms of "shall give" and "shall have" or "shall receive", the personification of accounts in the proper way would not be difficult and, with it, bookkeeping would become more intelligent to the proprietor, the layman and the student.

As Jackson has noted, "debtor" need not be a person, but can be an abstract party:

...it became the practice to extend the meanings of the terms ... beyond their original personal connotation and apply them to inanimate objects and abstract conceptions...

This sort of abstraction is already apparent in Richard Dafforne's 17th-century text The Merchant's Mirror, where he states "Cash representeth (to me) a man to whom I … have put my money into his keeping; the which by reason is obliged to render it back."

== Aspects of transactions ==
To determine whether to debit or credit a specific account, we use either the modern accounting equation approach (based on five accounting rules), or the classical approach (based on three 'golden rules'). Whether a debit increases or decreases an account's net balance depends on what kind of account it is. The basic principle is that the account receiving benefit is debited, while the account giving benefit is credited. For instance, an increase in an asset account is a debit. An increase in a liability or an equity account is a credit.

The classical approach has three golden rules, one for each type of account:

- Real accounts: Debit whatever comes in and credit whatever goes out.
- Personal accounts: Receiver's account is debited and giver's account is credited.
- Nominal accounts: Expenses and losses are debited and incomes and gains are credited.

Kind of account	Debit	Credit
**Asset**	**Increase**	Decrease
Liability	Decrease	**Increase**
Income/Revenue	Decrease	**Increase**
**Expense/Cost/Dividend**	**Increase**	Decrease
Equity/Capital	Decrease	**Increase**
Accounts with normal debit balances are in **bold**

Debits and credits occur simultaneously in every financial transaction in double-entry bookkeeping. In the accounting equation, Assets = Liabilities + Equity, so, if an asset account increases (a debit (left)), then either another asset account must decrease (a credit (right)), or a liability or equity account must increase (a credit (right)). In the extended equation, revenues increase equity, while expenses, costs, and dividends decrease equity, so their difference is the impact on the equation.

For example, if a company provides a service to a customer who does not pay immediately, the company records an increase in assets, Accounts Receivable with a debit entry, and an increase in Revenue, with a credit entry. When the company receives the cash from the customer, two accounts again change on the company side, the cash account is debited (increased) and the Accounts Receivable account is now decreased (credited). When the cash is deposited to the bank account, two things also change from the bank's perspective: the bank records an increase in its cash account (debit) and records an increase in its liability to the customer by recording a credit in the customer's account (which is not cash). Note that, technically, the deposit is not a decrease in the cash (asset) of the company and should not be recorded as such. It is just a transfer to a proper bank account of record in the company's books, not affecting the ledger.

To make it clearer, the bank views the transaction from a different perspective but follows the same rules: the bank's vault cash (asset) increases, which is a debit; the increase in the customer's account balance (liability from the bank's perspective) is a credit. A customer's periodic bank statement generally shows transactions from the bank's perspective, with cash deposits characterized as credits (liabilities) and withdrawals as debits (reductions in liabilities) in depositor's accounts. In the company's books the exact opposite entries should be recorded to account for the same cash. This concept is important since this is why so many people misunderstand what debit/credit really means.

== Commercial understanding ==
When setting up the accounting for a new business, a number of accounts are established to record all business transactions that are expected to occur. Typical accounts that relate to almost every business are: Cash, Accounts Receivable, Inventory, Accounts Payable and Retained Earnings. Each account can be broken down further, to provide additional detail as necessary. For example: Accounts Receivable can be broken down to show each customer that owes the company money. In simplistic terms, if Bob, Dave, and Roger owe the company money, the Accounts Receivable account will contain a separate account for Bob, and Dave and Roger. All 3 of these accounts would be added together and shown as a single number (i.e. total 'Accounts Receivable' – balance owed) on the balance sheet. All accounts for a company are grouped together and summarized on the balance sheet in 3 sections which are: Assets, Liabilities and Equity.

All accounts must first be classified as one of the five types of accounts (accounting elements) (asset, liability, equity, income and expense). To determine how to classify an account into one of the five elements, the definitions of the five account types must be fully understood. The definition of an asset according to IFRS is as follows, "An asset is a resource controlled by the entity as a result of past events from which future economic benefits are expected to flow to the entity". In simplistic terms, this means that Assets are accounts viewed as having a future value to the company (i.e. cash, accounts receivable, equipment, computers). Liabilities, conversely, would include items that are obligations of the company (i.e. loans, accounts payable, mortgages, debts).

The Equity section of the balance sheet typically shows the value of any outstanding shares that have been issued by the company as well as its earnings. All Income and expense accounts are summarized in the Equity Section in one line on the balance sheet called Retained Earnings. This account, in general, reflects the cumulative profit (retained earnings) or loss (retained deficit) of the company.

The Profit and Loss Statement is an expansion of the Retained Earnings Account. It breaks-out all the Income and expense accounts that were summarized in Retained Earnings. The Profit and Loss report is important in that it shows the detail of sales, cost of sales, expenses and ultimately the profit of the company. Most companies rely heavily on the profit and loss report and review it regularly to enable strategic decision making.

== Terminology ==
The words debit and credit can sometimes be confusing because they depend on the point of view from which a transaction is observed. In accounting terms, assets are recorded on the left side (debit) of asset accounts, because they are typically shown on the left side of the accounting equation (A=L+SE). Likewise, an increase in liabilities and shareholder's equity are recorded on the right side (credit) of those accounts, thus they also maintain the balance of the accounting equation. In other words, if "assets are increased with left side entries, the accounting equation is balanced only if increases in liabilities and shareholder’s equity are recorded on the opposite or right side. Conversely, decreases in assets are recorded on the right side of asset accounts, and decreases in liabilities and equities are recorded on the left side". Similar is the case with revenues and expenses, what increases shareholder's equity is recorded as credit because they are in the right side of equation and vice versa. Typically, when reviewing the financial statements of a business, Assets are Debits and Liabilities and Equity are Credits. For example, when two companies transact with one another say Company A buys something from Company B then Company A will record a decrease in cash (a Credit), and Company B will record an increase in cash (a Debit). The same transaction is recorded from two different perspectives.

This use of the terms can be counter-intuitive to people unfamiliar with bookkeeping concepts, who may always think of a credit as an increase and a debit as a decrease. This is because most people typically only see their personal bank accounts and billing statements (e.g., from a utility). A depositor's bank account is actually a Liability to the bank, because the bank legally owes the money to the depositor. Thus, when the customer makes a deposit, the bank credits the account (increases the bank's liability). At the same time, the bank adds the money to its own cash holdings account. Since this account is an Asset, the increase is a debit. But the customer typically does not see this side of the transaction.

On the other hand, when a utility customer pays a bill or the utility corrects an overcharge, the customer's account is credited. This is because the customer's account is one of the utility's accounts receivable, which are Assets to the utility because they represent money the utility can expect to receive from the customer in the future. Credits actually decrease Assets (the utility is now owed less money). If the credit is due to a bill payment, then the utility will add the money to its own cash account, which is a debit because the account is another Asset. Again, the customer views the credit as an increase in the customer's own money and does not see the other side of the transaction.

=== Debit cards and credit cards ===
Debit cards and credit cards are creative terms used by the banking industry to market and identify each card. From the cardholder's point of view, a credit card account normally contains a credit balance, a debit card account normally contains a debit balance. A debit card is used to make a purchase with one's own money. A credit card is used to make a purchase by borrowing money.

From the bank's point of view, when a debit card is used to pay a merchant, the payment causes a decrease in the amount of money the bank owes to the cardholder. From the bank's point of view, your debit card account is the bank's liability. A decrease to the bank's liability account is a debit. From the bank's point of view, when a credit card is used to pay a merchant, the payment causes an increase in the amount of money the bank is owed by the cardholder. From the bank's point of view, your credit card account is the bank's asset. An increase to the bank's asset account is a debit. Hence, using a debit card or credit card causes a debit to the cardholder's account in either situation when viewed from the bank's perspective.

=== General ledgers ===
General ledger is the term for the comprehensive collection of T-accounts (it is so called because there was a pre-printed vertical line in the middle of each ledger page and a horizontal line at the top of each ledger page, like a large letter T). Before the advent of computerized accounting, manual accounting procedure used a ledger book for each T-account. The collection of all these books was called the general ledger. The chart of accounts is the table of contents of the general ledger. Totaling of all debits and credits in the general ledger at the end of a financial period is known as trial balance.

"Daybooks" or journals are used to list every single transaction that took place during the day, and the list is totaled at the end of the day. These daybooks are not part of the double-entry bookkeeping system. The information recorded in these daybooks is then transferred to the general ledgers, where it is said to be posted. Modern computer software allows for the instant update of each ledger account; for example, when recording a cash receipt in a cash receipts journal a debit is posted to a cash ledger account with a corresponding credit to the ledger account from which the cash was received. Not every single transaction needs to be entered into a T-account; usually only the sum (the batch total) for the day of each book transaction is entered in the general ledger.

== The five accounting elements ==
There are five fundamental elements within accounting. These elements are as follows: Assets, Liabilities, Equity (or Capital), Income (or Revenue) and Expenses. The five accounting elements are all affected in either a positive or negative way. A credit transaction does not always dictate a positive value or increase in a transaction and similarly, a debit does not always indicate a negative value or decrease in a transaction. An asset account is often referred to as a "debit account" due to the account's standard increasing attribute on the debit side. When an asset (e.g. an espresso machine) has been acquired in a business, the transaction will affect the debit side of that asset account illustrated below:

Asset
Debits (Dr)	Credits (Cr)
X	

The "X" in the debit column denotes the increasing effect of a transaction on the asset account balance (total debits less total credits), because a debit to an asset account is an increase. The asset account above has been added to by a debit value X, i.e. the balance has increased by £X or $X. Likewise, in the liability account below, the X in the credit column denotes the increasing effect on the liability account balance (total credits less total debits), because a credit to a liability account is an increase.

All "mini-ledgers" in this section show standard increasing attributes for the five elements of accounting.

Liability
Debits (Dr)	Credits (Cr)
	X

Income
Debits (Dr)	Credits (Cr)
	X

Expenses
Debits (Dr)	Credits (Cr)
X	

Equity
Debits (Dr)	Credits (Cr)
	X

Summary table of standard increasing and decreasing attributes for the accounting elements:

ACCOUNT TYPE	DEBIT	CREDIT
Asset	+	−
Expense	+	−
Dividends	+	−
Liability	−	+
Revenue	−	+
Common shares	−	+
Retained earnings	−	+
Contra asset	-	+

=== Attributes of accounting elements per real, personal, and nominal accounts ===
Real accounts are assets. Personal accounts are liabilities and owners' equity and represent people and entities that have invested in the business. Nominal accounts are revenue, expenses, gains, and losses. Accountants close out accounts at the end of each accounting period. This method is known as the traditional approach.

Account type		Debit	Credit
Real	Assets	Increase	Decrease
Personal	Liability	Decrease	Increase
Personal	Owner's equity	Decrease	Increase
Nominal	Revenue	Decrease	Increase
Nominal	Expenses	Increase	Decrease
Nominal	Gain	Decrease	Increase
Nominal	Loss	Increase	Decrease

== Principle ==
Each transaction that takes place within the business will consist of at least one debit to a specific account and at least one credit to another specific account. A debit to one account can be balanced by more than one credit to other accounts, and vice versa. For all transactions, the total debits must be equal to the total credits and therefore balance.

The general accounting equation is as follows:

Assets = Equity + Liabilities,
A = E + L.

The equation thus becomes A – L – E = 0 (zero). When the total debits equals the total credits for each account, then the equation balances.

The extended accounting equation is as follows:

Assets + Expenses = Equity/Capital + Liabilities + Revenue,
A + Ex = E + L + R.

In this form, increases to the amount of accounts on the left-hand side of the equation are recorded as debits, and decreases as credits. Conversely for accounts on the right-hand side, increases to the amount of accounts are recorded as credits to the account, and decreases as debits.

This can also be rewritten in the equivalent form:

Assets = Liabilities + Equity/Capital + (revenue − Expenses),
A = L + E + (R − Ex),

where the relationship of the Income and Expenses accounts to Equity and profit is a bit clearer. Here Revenue and Expenses are regarded as temporary or nominal accounts which pertain only to the current accounting period whereas Asset, Liability, and Equity accounts are permanent or real accounts pertaining to the lifetime of the business. The temporary accounts are closed to the Equity account at the end of the accounting period to record profit/loss for the period. Both sides of these equations must be equal (balance).

Each transaction is recorded in a ledger or "T" account, e.g. a ledger account named "Bank" that can be changed with either a debit or credit transaction.

In accounting it is acceptable to draw-up a ledger account in the following manner for representational purposes:

Bank
Debits (Dr)	Credits (Cr)

=== Accounts pertaining to the five accounting elements ===
Accounts are created/opened when the need arises for whatever purpose or situation the entity may have. For example, if your business is an airline company they will have to purchase airplanes, therefore even if an account is not listed below, a bookkeeper or accountant can create an account for a specific item, such as an asset account for airplanes. In order to understand how to classify an account into one of the five elements, a good understanding of the definitions of these accounts is required. Below are examples of some of the more common accounts that pertain to the five accounting elements:

==== Asset accounts ====
Asset accounts are economic resources which benefit the business/entity and will continue to do so. They are Cash, bank, accounts receivable, inventory, land, buildings/plant, machinery, furniture, equipment, supplies, vehicles, trademarks and patents, goodwill, prepaid expenses, prepaid insurance, debtors (people who owe us money, due within one year), VAT input etc.

Two types of basic asset classification:

- Current assets: Assets which operate in a financial year or assets that can be used up, or converted within one year or less are called current assets. For example, Cash, bank, accounts receivable, inventory (people who owe us money, due within one year), prepaid expenses, prepaid insurance, VAT input and many more.
- Non-current assets: Assets that are not recorded in transactions or hold for more than one year or in an accounting period are called Non-current assets. For example, land, buildings/plant, machinery, furniture, equipment, vehicles, trademarks and patents, goodwill etc.

==== Liability accounts ====
Liability accounts record debts or future obligations a business or entity owes to others. When one institution borrows from another for a period of time, the ledger of the borrowing institution categorises the argument under liability accounts.

The basic classifications of liability accounts are:

- Current liability, when money only may be owed for the current accounting period or periodical. Examples include accounts payable, salaries and wages payable, income taxes, bank overdrafts, accrued expenses, sales taxes, advance payments (unearned revenue), debt and accrued interest on debt, customer deposits, VAT output, etc.
- Long-term liability, when money may be owed for more than one year. Examples include trust accounts, debenture, mortgage loans and more.

==== Equity accounts ====
Equity accounts record the claims of the owners of the business/entity to the assets of that business/entity. Capital, retained earnings, drawings, common stock, accumulated funds, etc.

==== Income/revenue accounts ====
Income accounts record all increases in Equity other than that contributed by the owner/s of the business/entity. Services rendered, sales, interest income, membership fees, rent income, interest from investment, recurring receivables, donation etc.

==== Expense accounts ====
Expense accounts record all decreases in the owners' equity which occur from using the assets or increasing liabilities in delivering goods or services to a customer – the costs of doing business. Telephone, water, electricity, repairs, salaries, wages, depreciation, amortization, bad debts, stationery, entertainment, honorarium, rent, fuel, utility, interest etc.

=== Example ===
Quick Services business purchases a computer for £500, on credit, from ABC Computers. Recognize the following transaction for Quick Services in a ledger account (T-account):

Quick Services has acquired a new computer which is classified as an asset within the business. According to the accrual basis of accounting, even though the computer has been purchased on credit, the computer is already the property of Quick Services and must be recognised as such. Therefore, the equipment account of Quick Services increases and is debited:

Equipment (Asset)
(Dr)	(Cr)
500	

As the transaction for the new computer is made on credit, the payable "ABC Computers" has not yet been paid. As a result, a liability is created within the entity's records. Therefore, to balance the accounting equation the corresponding liability account is credited:

Payable ABC Computers (Liability)
(Dr)	(Cr)
	500

The above example can be written in journal form:

	Dr	Cr
Equipment	500	
ABC Computers (Payable)		500

The journal entry "ABC Computers" is indented to indicate that this is the credit transaction. It is accepted accounting practice to indent credit transactions recorded within a journal.

In the accounting equation form:

A = E + L,
500 = 0 + 500 (the accounting equation is therefore balanced).

=== Further examples ===
1. A business pays rent with cash: You increase rent (expense) by recording a debit transaction, and decrease cash (asset) by recording a credit transaction.
2. A business receives cash for a sale: You increase cash (asset) by recording a debit transaction, and increase sales (income) by recording a credit transaction.
3. A business buys equipment with cash: You increase equipment (asset) by recording a debit transaction, and decrease cash (asset) by recording a credit transaction.
4. A business borrows with a cash loan: You increase cash (asset) by recording a debit transaction, and increase loan (liability) by recording a credit transaction.
5. A business pays salaries with cash: You increase salary (expenses) by recording a debit transaction, and decrease cash (asset) by recording a credit transaction.
6. The totals show the net effect on the accounting equation and the double-entry principle, where the transactions are balanced.

	Account	Debit (Dr)	Credit (Cr)
1.	Rent (Ex)	100	
	Cash (A)		100
2.	Cash (A)	50	
	Sales (I)		50
3.	Equipment (A)	5200	
	Cash (A)		5200
4.	Cash (A)	11000	
	Loan (L)		11000
5.	Salary (Ex)	5000	
	Cash (A)		5000
6.	Total (Dr)	$21350	
	Total (Cr)		$21350

== T-accounts ==
The process of using debits and credits creates a ledger format that resembles the letter "T". The term "T-account" is accounting jargon for a "ledger account" and is often used when discussing bookkeeping. The reason that a ledger account is often referred to as a T-account is due to the way the account is physically drawn on paper (representing a "T"). The left column is for debit (Dr) entries, while the right column is for credit (Cr) entries.

Debits (Dr)	Credits (Cr)

== Contra account ==
All accounts also can be debited or credited depending on what transaction has taken place. For example, when a vehicle is purchased using cash, the asset account "Vehicles" is debited and simultaneously the asset account "Bank or Cash" is credited due to the payment for the vehicle using cash. Some balance sheet items have corresponding "contra" accounts, with negative balances, that offset them. Examples are accumulated depreciation, accumulated amortization, and allowance for bad debts (also known as allowance for doubtful accounts) against accounts receivable. United States GAAP utilizes the term contra for specific accounts only and does not recognize the second half of a transaction as a contra, thus the term is restricted to accounts that are related. For example, sales returns and allowance and sales discounts are contra revenues with respect to sales, as the balance of each contra (a debit) is the opposite of sales (a credit). To understand the actual value of sales, one must net the contras against sales, which gives rise to the term net sales (meaning net of the contras).

A more specific definition in common use is an account with a balance that is the opposite of the normal balance (Dr/Cr) for that section of the general ledger. An example is an office coffee fund: Expense "Coffee" (Dr) may be immediately followed by "Coffee – employee contributions" (Cr). Such an account is used for clarity rather than being a necessary part of GAAP (generally accepted accounting principles).

== Accounts classification ==
Each of the following accounts is either an Asset (A), Contra Account (CA), Liability (L), Shareholders' Equity (SE), Revenue (Rev), Expense (Exp) or Dividend (Div) account.

Account transactions can be recorded as a debit to one account and a credit to another account using the modern or traditional approaches in accounting and following are their normal balances:

Accounts	A/CA/L/SE/Rev/Exp/Div	Dr/ Cr
Inventory	A	Dr
Wages expense	Exp	Dr
Accounts payable	L	Cr
Retained earnings	SE	Cr
Revenue	Rev	Cr
Cost of goods sold	Exp	Dr
Accounts receivable	A	Dr
Allowance for doubtful accounts	CA (A/R)	Cr
Common shares	SE	Cr
Accumulated depreciation	CA (A)	Cr
Investment in shares	A	Dr
