= Three-leg bookkeeping =

The three-leg bookkeeping, (Note: simplified Chinese: 三脚帐; traditional Chinese: 三腳帳; pinyin: sānjiǎozhàng, simplified Chinese: 三脚书; traditional Chinese: 三腳書; pinyin: sānjiǎoshū, or simplified Chinese: 跛脚帐; traditional Chinese: 跛腳帳; pinyin: bǒjiǎozhàng) also known as the three-leg accounting, was a combination of single-entry and double-entry bookkeeping used in the Ming Chinese economy from the mid-15th century onwards. It was an improvement on the four-pillar balancing method, a single-entry system used in earlier centuries. The method was primarily used by larger merchants and bankers until the late Ming period (1570–1640), when a double-entry system called "Dragon Gate bookkeeping" emerged among bankers, followed by the development of double-entry four-leg bookkeeping in the mid-18th century.

== Origin and description ==
The three-leg bookkeeping system originated in the mid-15th century and combined elements of both double-entry and single-entry bookkeeping. Under this system, receivables and transfers were recorded using double entries, while cash payments were only recorded once.

This system was a significant improvement in the development of traditional single-entry bookkeeping. It utilized the same three-book structure of memorandum, journal, and ledger, with a focus on the journal. Typically, three journals were used: the purchase and sales book (货清, huoqing bu), the cash book (qinqing bu), and the transfer and personal accounts book (wanlai bu). Transactions were entered into the journals daily from the memoranda (草流, caoliu bu). Journal pages were divided into an upper and lower section. (Note: Dividing the pages of account books with a horizontal line across the middle, with receipts entered above and expenditures below, was a characteristic feature of the three-part accounting system and of the Chinese accounting systems that followed it, including the Dragon Gate bookkeeping system and the four-leg bookkeeping method.) Incoming (來, lai) and outgoing (去, qu) items were recorded in the upper and lower sections of the journal page, respectively, as receipts/increases (收, shou) and expenditures/decreases (付, fu). This shou/fu pair was equivalent to the ru/chu pair used in government administration. Therefore, each transaction was recorded twice—once in the upper and once in the lower section of the appropriate books. Only cash payments were recorded once in the purchase and sales journal.

Every five days, the journals were summarized and copied into the ledger, with the resulting balance calculated using the four-element method. This method's basic equation was:

previous balance (管, guan) + receipts (收, shou) - expenditures (付, fu) = current balance (在, zai).

Cash transactions were recorded with single entries, while all other transactions were recorded with double entries, giving rise to the name "three-leg bookkeeping system."

In the late Ming period (1570–1640), this system began to be replaced by the "Dragon Gate bookkeeping system," which emerged among bankers and later spread to the commercial and manufacturing sectors. By the mid-18th century, this system had evolved into the double-entry four-leg bookkeeping system, which remained in use until the end of the 19th century.
