= Three-pillar accounting system =

The three-pillar accounting system, (Note: Chinese: 三柱结算; pinyin: sānzhù jiésuàn) also known as three-pillar balancing method, was a single-entry accounting system used in China during the Zhou dynasty and in the centuries that followed. It was named after its method of closing the accounting books, which relied on a basic equation: income − expenditure = balance.

At the turn of the 9th and 10th centuries, toward the end of the Tang dynasty, it was refined into the four-pillar balancing method. This new method became widespread in the economic environment of Song dynasty and gradually replaced the three-pillar method.

== Origin and description ==
As state institutions developed in China, the complexity of accounting records also increased. During the Zhou dynasty (11th–3rd century BCE), specialized officials responsible for managing state accounts emerged. The evolution of accounting methods corresponded to the gradual growth of both governmental and commercial activities. Accountants during the Zhou period utilized budgetary accounts, expenditure control, and regular reports (submitted every ten days, monthly, and yearly), as well as government audits. They emphasized the importance of accuracy, timeliness, and reliability in accounting books, and also introduced systematic taxation.

The system of single-entry bookkeeping used at the time was known as the three-pillar accounting system (or three-pillar balancing method). Accounting practice was characterized by simple entries and the division and classification of accounts through the use of two types of books: the journal (草流, caoliu) and the ledger (總淸, zongqing). Transactions were recorded in the journals consecutively as they occurred. Entries began with an initial symbol marking the nature of the transaction—income was marked by the character ru (入), expenditure by chu (出)—followed by a description of the transaction and the amount. The books were closed using the three-pillar method, whose basic (and triadic—hence the name of the method) equation was:

income (ru) − expenditure (chu) = balance (余, yu).

During the Tang period, advancements in accounting practices led to the development of a system based on three essential types of accounting books: the memorandum (caoliu), the journal (細流, xiliu), and the general ledger (zongqing). Another variation of this system included the caoliu (memorandum), the riqing bu (日淸, journal), and the teqing bu (general ledger). Each transaction was recorded in a memorandum, and at the end of the day, these records were transferred to the journal. For significant transactions, subsidiary journals were also maintained. Every ten days, the journal entries were then transcribed into the general ledger.

In the 10th century, Chinese accountants expanded this three-pillar method into a four-pillar method. This new system included two separate items in the final equation: the opening balance and the closing balance of the account, replacing the previous single closing balance.
