= Dome Publishing =

Accounting ledger publishing company

- Status: Active
- Founded: 1940; 85 years ago
- Founder: Nicholas Picchione
- Country of origin: United States
- Headquarters location: Warwick, Rhode Island
- Distribution: National
- Nonfiction topics: Bookkeeping, accounting
- Official website: thedomecompanies.com

Dome Publishing is an American accounting publisher founded in 1940 by CPA Nicholas Picchione. The company publishes a series of ledgers designed to simplify the bookkeeping process for small businesses (especially those whose personnel are not experienced in bookkeeping and accounting), as well as software based on their ledgers and several ergonomic products for use in business and other settings.

== Products ==
Their flagship products are their weekly and monthly ledgers, though Dome also sells books for personal finance and other record keeping.

Dome also publishes several of their books co-branded with Avon and targets them towards home-based and multi-level marketing businesses, as well as a Spanish-language edition of their monthly ledger.

With one of the most popular products for pencil-and-paper accounting, Dome products offers a small business accounting software program called Dome Accounting By Computer.

== Format ==
The Dome accounting method used in their Weekly and Monthly Bookkeeping Records is essentially a simplified form of single-entry bookkeeping. Each standard accounting ledger begins with a basic introduction to accounting and a summary of US tax law, followed by a ledger section, which consists of a series of pages to record business expenditures followed by a summation page that lists daily receipts next to a categorized summary of expenditures; after this is a balance sheet and a summary sheet for tax purposes. After the ledger section in the monthly edition, a payroll section with a similar organization follows.
