= Four-pillar accounting system =

The four-pillar accounting system (Note: simplified Chinese: 四柱结算; traditional Chinese: 四柱結算; pinyin: sìzhù jiésuàn) was a single-entry method that originated in China in the 9th–10th centuries. It developed as an improvement on the earlier three-pillar system. The four-pillar method gained widespread adoption during the Song dynasty and remained the standard used in the state administration of the Ming and Qing dynasties. In the mid-15th century, larger merchants and banks began replacing it with a hybrid of single-entry and double-entry procedures known as the three-leg bookkeeping system. This, in turn, was later supplanted by fully double-entry systems—most notably the Dragon Gate bookkeeping system in the late 16th century and the four-leg bookkeeping system in the mid-18th century.

== Origin and description ==
The development of bookkeeping methods in medieval China was closely tied to the growth of both state and commercial activities. Over time, these techniques evolved from simple to more sophisticated methods. During the Tang period, a system of journals and ledgers was established, with three main types of accounting books: the memorandum (草流, caoliu), the journal (細流, xiliu), and the ledger (總清, zongqing). Some sources refer to these as the memorandum (caoliu), the daily journal (riqing bu, 日清), and the ledger (teqing bu). Each transaction was recorded in a note (memorandum), which was then entered into the journal at the end of each day. For more significant transactions, subsidiary journals were also maintained. Every ten days, the journal entries were transferred into the ledger.

In the 920s, the Tang period saw another innovation with the development of the four-pillar method from the previous three-pillar method. This new method replaced the single balance item with two figures: the opening and closing balance of the account. The basic equation of the four-pillar method was:

previous balance (管, guan) + receipts (收, shou) − expenditures (除, chu) = balance (在, zai).
Alternatively, it can be expressed as: previous balance (jiuguan, 旧管) + new receipts (xinshou, 新收) = expenditures (kaichu, 开除) + existing balance (shishizai, 事实在).

The method described in this text was widely adopted in Song China and remained the standard for state administration during the Ming and Qing dynasties.

Smaller entrepreneurs and conservative banks continued to use single-entry bookkeeping, specifically the four-pillar method, until the late 19th century when Western accounting practices began to spread in China. Larger merchants and bankers, on the other hand, started to replace the four-pillar method with a hybrid of single-entry and double-entry procedures known as the three-leg bookkeeping system as early as the mid-15th century. This was later followed by fully double-entry systems, such as the Dragon Gate bookkeeping system in the late 16th century and the four-leg bookkeeping system in the mid-18th century.
