= Four-leg bookkeeping =

The four-leg bookkeeping, (Note: simplified Chinese: 四脚帐; traditional Chinese: 四腳帳; pinyin: sìjiǎozhàng) also known as the Heaven-Earth balancing accounting, (Note: simplified Chinese: 天地合账; traditional Chinese: 天地合賬; pinyin: tiāndìhézhàng) was a double-entry bookkeeping system used in Qing China from the mid-18th century. This system was developed as an improvement on the Dragon Gate bookkeeping, which was a double-entry method used during the late Ming period (1570–1640). It was widely used by major Chinese merchants and bankers until the introduction of Western accounting methods in the second half of the 19th century.

== Origin and description ==
The four-leg bookkeeping, also known as the Heaven–Earth balancing accounting, emerged in the early 18th century. It introduced an improved framework for maintaining ledgers and classifying accounts, with its final reports consisting of the profit-and-loss statement (caixiang) and the balance sheet (cun'gai).

The increasing complexity of commercial and industrial transactions made such enhancements necessary. The system employed several principal ledgers together with multiple subordinate ledgers at different levels. Its main distinction from the earlier Dragon Gate bookkeeping system lay in the method of closing the books, placing emphasis on balancing assets and liabilities according to the equation:

assets (存, cun) = liabilities (該, gai) ± profit/loss.

If the accounts were in proper order, the total value of assets had to be equal to the sum of liabilities and profit (or minus loss). This was known as achieving a state of balance between Heaven and Earth. The significance of this process was in recognizing the distinct nature of revenue and expenditure accounts, which needed to be closed and transferred into the statement of assets and liabilities (also known as the balance sheet) as either profit or loss.

The four-leg bookkeeping, along with the Dragon Gate bookkeeping method, was widely used by major Chinese merchants and bankers until the adoption of Western accounting methods in the late 19th century. Many small and medium-sized entrepreneurs, as well as more conservative and smaller banks, continued to rely on single-entry bookkeeping (typically using the four-pillar accounting system), while a minority used the three-leg bookkeeping.
