= Dragon Gate bookkeeping =

The Dragon Gate bookkeeping, (Note: simplified Chinese: 龙门账; traditional Chinese: 龍門賬; pinyin: lóngménzhàng) also known as the Dragon Gate accounting, was a double-entry bookkeeping system that originated in China during the late Ming period (1570–1640). Unlike European accounting practices, it was developed independently through the refinement of the three-leg bookkeeping system, which combined elements of both single- and double-entry records. By the mid-18th century, a more advanced four-leg bookkeeping system had emerged based on Dragon Gate bookkeeping. This system was significant in the history of Chinese accounting as it was the first purely double-entry system.

== Origin and description ==
The Dragon Gate bookkeeping first appeared among local bankers in the late Ming period and later spread to commercial and manufacturing sectors during the Ming–Qing transition (mid-17th century). It emerged independently of European methods and built upon China's traditional bookkeeping practices. Its predecessor, the three-leg bookkeeping system, combined elements of single-entry and double-entry methods: accounts receivable and internal transfers were recorded using double-entry techniques, while cash transactions were recorded only once.

The Dragon Gate bookkeeping was characterized by strict categorization of transactions into income, expenditure, receivables, and payables, and utilized double-entry recording for all operations. It inherited the basic structure of accounting books from earlier Chinese systems, such as the three-leg system and the four-element balance method used in single-entry bookkeeping. Multiple journals were used, including separate journals for purchases, sales, cash transactions, and transfers. In addition to the general ledger, bookkeepers also utilized specialized ledgers for purchases, sales, inventory, and other items.

The accounts were divided into four categories:

1. Increases (進, jin), which included all sales and income;
2. Decreases (缴, jiao), which included all expenditures and losses, such as purchases of goods, wages and other operating costs, and taxes;
3. Assets (存, cun), which comprised the property and holdings of a person or company; and
4. Liabilities (該, gai), which included the capital and obligations that corresponded to (and offset) the assets in the preceding category.

In the account books, individual entries were categorized based on their nature. Increases and assets were recorded in the upper section of the page, while decreases and liabilities were placed in the lower section. All entries were made in double form, with corresponding records in the upper section (marked 收, shou, "increase") and the lower section (marked 付, fu, "outflow") of the relevant journal. For example, if a purchase was made on credit, it would be entered in the upper part of the purchases journal as "shou—owed to Mr. P., 5 liang", and in the lower part as "fu—purchase of goods, 5 liang". Similarly, an operating expense would be recorded in the upper part of the miscellaneous-items journal as "shou—cash payment, 1 liang", with a corresponding entry in the lower part as "fu—shop operation expense, 1 liang".

Entries in the journals were regularly summarized and transferred to the general ledgers, which were closed at the end of each accounting period, typically on a monthly basis. There were two methods used to determine the value of goods sold during the accounting closing. The first method involved calculating the cost of goods sold using the inventory valuation formula:

cost of goods sold = total purchases + opening inventory − closing inventory.

The second method, known as the highest-price method, was more commonly used and involved multiplying the highest purchase price by the number of units sold to determine the cost of goods sold:

cost of goods sold = highest purchase price × number of units sold.

The profit or loss for the period was determined by calculating the difference between increases (jin) and decreases (jiao), or between assets (cun) and liabilities/capital (gai). When closing the books, it was essential for the following balance equation to hold true:

increases (jin) − decreases (jiao) = assets (cun) − capital and liabilities (gai).

The Dragon Gate bookkeeping system played a crucial role in the advancement of accounting in China. Its implementation of double-entry recording greatly aided in comprehending the true economic nature of transactions. It also improved the conceptualization of profit and loss, which could now be calculated as the difference between income and expenditure, as well as the difference between assets and liabilities. This, in turn, provided a clearer understanding of the connections between capital, income, assets, expenses, and liabilities. The use of double-entry also facilitated the identification of errors and discrepancies.
