= Single-entry bookkeeping =

Method of accounting

Single-entry bookkeeping, also known as single-entry accounting, one-write bookkeeping, or pegboard bookkeeping, is a method of bookkeeping that relies on a one-sided accounting entry to maintain financial information. The primary bookkeeping record in single-entry bookkeeping is the cash book, which is similar to a checking account register (in UK: cheque account, current account), except all entries are allocated among several categories of income and expense accounts. Separate account records are maintained for petty cash, accounts payable and receivable, and other relevant transactions such as inventory and travel expenses. To save time and avoid the errors of manual calculations, single-entry bookkeeping can be done today with do-it-yourself bookkeeping software.

Double entry accounting often requires commitment which most sole proprietors cannot afford to do or simply are not interested in. Among these types of businesses it is common for them to only keep records of bill payments and cash they received during the course of the business. Nonetheless, there is some level of record keeping as these businesses are keeping track of income and expenditure of the business. As such, the practice of keeping partial records of business related transactions which is outside the requirements of double entry book keeping is called “single entry accounting” / “Accounting for incomplete records”.

Most businesses maintain a record of transactions using double-entry bookkeeping. However, many smaller businesses use single-entry books that record the "bare essentials." In some cases, only records of cash, accounts receivable, accounts payable and taxes paid may be maintained.

This type of accounting with additional information can typically be compiled into an income statement and statement of affairs by a professional accountant. Before the digital age it was common for businesses to maintain a Daily Ledger recording all credit and debit transactions in real time (such as sales, payments of wages, purchases of stock, extending credit to a customer or customer refunds) producing a daily trading tally that could be reconciled with cash to detect mistakes or theft similar to the later process of Automated Till reconciliation. The information contained in the Daily Ledger would then be transferred into a more comprehensive set of double-entry accounts on a weekly or monthly basis.

== Advantages ==
Single-entry bookkeeping systems are used because of their simplicity, while double-entry bookkeeping may require the services of a trained person.

According to the Internal Revenue Service, single-entry bookkeeping is based on the income statement (profit or loss statement). It can be simple and practical for those starting a small business.

Additionally, the IRS states:

- A single-entry system does not include equal debit and credit to the balance sheet and income statement accounts. It is not self-balancing. Arithmetic errors in the account totals are thus common. Reconciliation of the books and records to the return is an important audit step.
- A single-entry system may consist only of transactions posted in a notebook, daybook, or journal. However, it may include a complete set of journals and a ledger providing accounts for all important items.

== Disadvantages ==
- Data may not be available to management for effectively planning and controlling the business.
- Lack of systematic and precise bookkeeping may lead to inefficient administration and reduced control over the affairs of the business.
- Theft and other losses are less likely to be detected.
