= De ludo scachorum =

Manuscript on the game of chess

De ludo scachorum (English: On the Game of Chess)
- Library of the Palazzo Coronini Cronberg, Gorizia, Italy
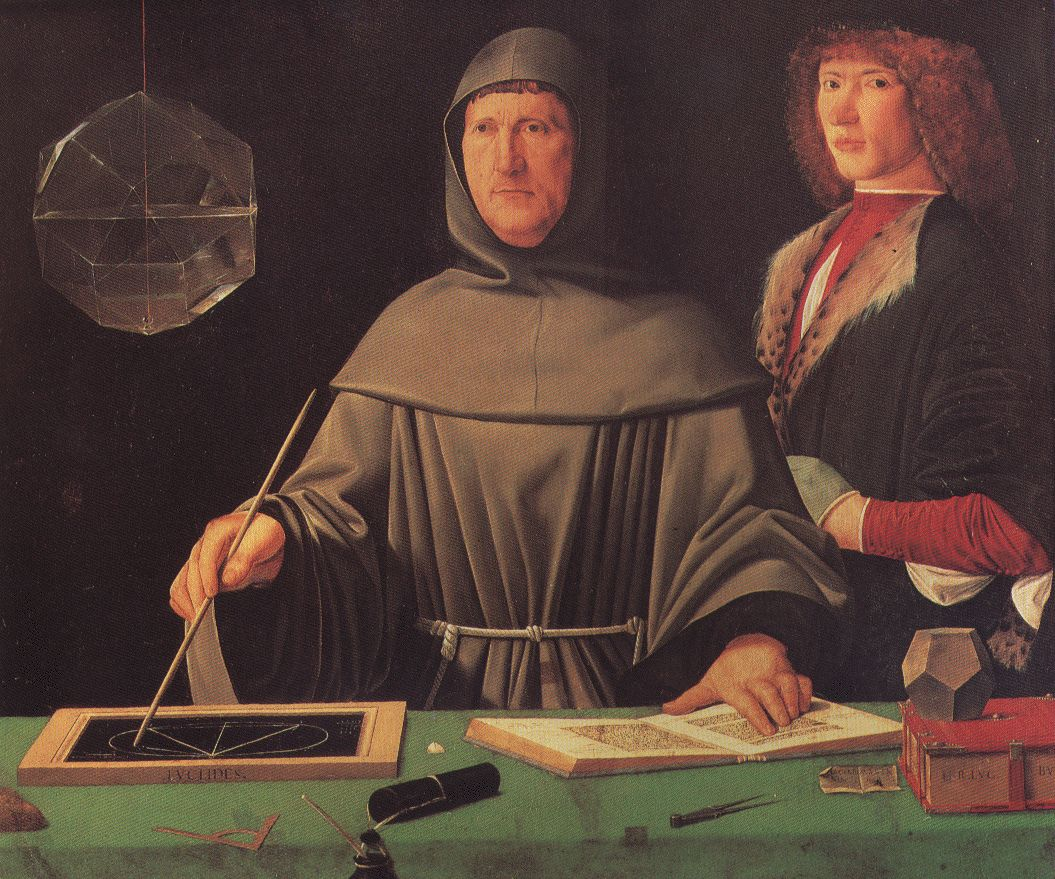
- Portrait of the author
- Also known as: Schifanoia
- Date: c. 1500
- Place of origin: Mantua, Duchy of Mantua
- Language: Latin
- Author: Luca Pacioli
- Illuminated by: Leonardo da Vinci (?)
- Dedicated to: Isabella d'Este; Francesco II Gonzaga
- Size: Forty-eight pages
- Contents: Chess problems
- Discovered: 2006

De ludo scachorum ('On the Game of Chess'), also known as Schifanoia ('the "Boredom Dodger"'), is a Latin-language manuscript on the game of chess written around 1500 by Luca Pacioli, a leading mathematician of the Renaissance. Created in the times when rules of the game (especially the way queen and bishop move) were evolving to the ones known today, the manuscript contains over a hundred chess problems, to be solved – depending on the problem – using either the old or the modern rules.

The long-lost manuscript was rediscovered in 2006 and gathered public attention in 2008, following the plausible suggestion that the chess pieces in its illustrations were designed or perhaps even drawn by Leonardo da Vinci.

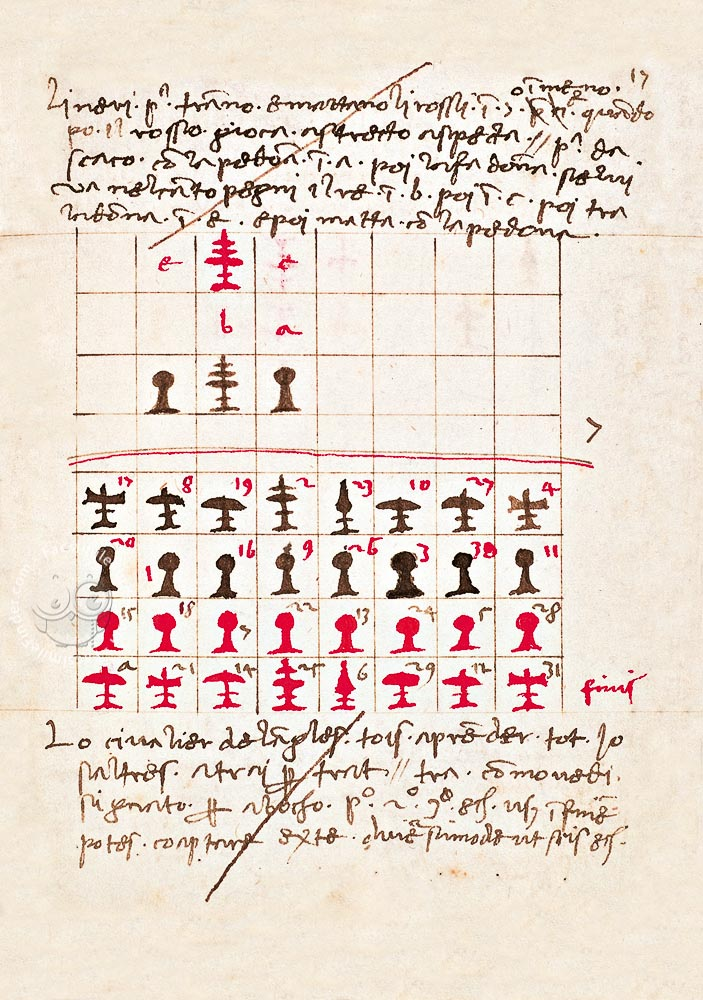
De Ludo Scachorum

== Discovery ==
The manuscript was discovered in 2006 by book historian Duilio Contin, in the 22,000-volume library of the Palazzo Coronini Cronberg in Gorizia, Italy. The owner, Count Guglielmo Coronini, bought it alongside other old books from an unnamed "Venetian poet and bibliophile" in 1963. The manuscript gathered public attention in February 2008, after Franco Rocco, who was researching the work, suggested that the chess pieces in diagrams illustrating it were designed or perhaps even drawn by Leonardo.

== History and contents ==
Pacioli created the manuscript at the beginning of the 16th century, soon after a new way of movement for queen and bishop was introduced to the rules of chess in the 1470s, making those pieces considerably stronger. In addition, pawn promotion became more dangerous, since getting an additional queen now had bigger impact on the game. The forty-eight-page manuscript contains over a hundred educational positions and chess problems, drawn in red and black, featuring both the original and the new rules, the latter known as a la rabiosa (meaning "angry" in Spanish), a reference to the enhanced powers of the queen.

=== Possible involvement of Leonardo da Vinci ===
It is plausible that Leonardo da Vinci had a hand in the representation of the chess pieces. Pacioli and Leonardo were friends, and Leonardo is known to have provided illustrations for Pacioli's book De divina proportione (English: About the Divine Proportions). De ludo scacchorum was created somewhere after 1499, when they both fled from Milan to Mantua (after the former was invaded by Louis XII of France), where they were protected by the chess-loving Isabella d'Este, to whom the manuscript is dedicated.

It has been noted that the artistic quality of initial representation of the pieces at the start of the book, where they are drawn in array, appears to be superior to that found in the later diagrams. It is plausible that Leonardo may have created the "original designs" featured at the beginning, while the pieces illustrating the rest of manuscript were drawn by someone else. The design of the queen is remarkably similar to the form of a fountain drawn by the artist in his Codex Atlanticus, a twelve-volume, bound set of drawings and writings. Furthermore, the pieces were drawn using both left and right hands, and Leonardo is known to have been left-handed. The proportions of the pieces follow the principle of the golden ratio, a phenomenon which fascinated both the polymaths.

== Modern analysis ==
Position: a8 black king, d8 black rook, e8 black knight, f8 black bishop, h7 black bishop, g6 white rook, h6 black rook, e5 black queen, c4 white king, e4 white bishop, h4 white knight, g3 white rook, d2 black pawn, f2 black pawn, g2 white pawn, h2 white bishop, b1 white queen, d1 white knight, g1 black knight

Black to move, white to win (according to Raymond Keene's interpretation of one of the diagrams contained in De ludo scachorum)

Chess theoreticians analyzed Pacioli's knowledge of the subject after one of the problems from the manuscript was published first by The Guardian and later elsewhere, including Raymond Keene's column in The Times and Susan Polgar's blog. It was unclear whether the position was supposed to be played using the old or the new rules; furthermore, the diagram included a white pawn on the first rank (on the d1 square), an illegal position. Keene surmised that the problem should be solved using modern rules, while the pawn should be replaced with a white knight, as it was most likely drawn mistakenly. Based on this personal interpretation, Keene described the puzzle as "fiendishly difficult" and "highly advanced for its time", while Richard Eales noted "nothing like this puzzle has so far been found in other publications, or the older manuscripts or printed chess books". Keene considers the author a "chess genius", because of how he was able to quickly develop a deep understanding of the way the new rules will change chess. He also believes that it is possible Leonardo created some of the problems in the manuscript, including the one presented by The Guardian.

== See also ==
- 15th century in literature
- 2006 in chess
- 2008 in chess
- Latin literature
- List of manuscripts
