= Accounting ethics =

"Accountants and the accountancy profession exist as a means of public service; the distinction which separates a profession from a mere means of livelihood is that the profession is accountable to standards of the public interest, and beyond the compensation paid by clients."

— Robert H. Montgomery, describing ethics in accounting in 2009

Accounting ethics is primarily a field of applied ethics and is part of business ethics and human ethics, the study of moral values and judgments as they apply to accountancy. It is an example of professional ethics. Accounting was introduced by Luca Pacioli, and later expanded by government groups, professional organizations, and independent companies. Ethics are taught in accounting courses at higher education institutions as well as by companies training accountants and auditors.

Due to the wide range of accounting services and recent corporate collapses, attention has been drawn to ethical standards accepted within the accounting profession. These collapses have resulted in a widespread disregard for the reputation of the accounting profession. To combat the criticism and prevent fraudulent accounting, various accounting organizations and governments have developed regulations and remedies for improved ethics among the accounting profession.

== Importance of ethics ==
The nature of the work carried out by accountants and auditors requires a high level of ethics. Shareholders, potential shareholders, and other users of the financial statements rely heavily on the yearly financial statements of a company as they can use this information to make an informed of the decision about investment. They rely on the opinion of the accountants who prepared the statements, as well as the auditors that verified it, to present a true and fair view of the company. Knowledge of ethics can help accountants and auditors to overcome ethical dilemmas, allowing for the right choice that, although it may not benefit the company, will benefit the public who relies on the accountant/auditor's reporting.

Most countries have differing focuses on enforcing accounting laws. In Germany, accounting legislation is governed by "tax law"; in Sweden, by "accounting law"; and in the United Kingdom, by the "company law". In addition, countries have their own organizations which regulate accounting. For example, Sweden has the Bokföringsnämden (BFN - Accounting Standards Board), Spain the Instituto de Comtabilidad y Auditoria de Cuentas (ICAC), and the United States the Financial Accounting Standards Board (FASB).

== History ==
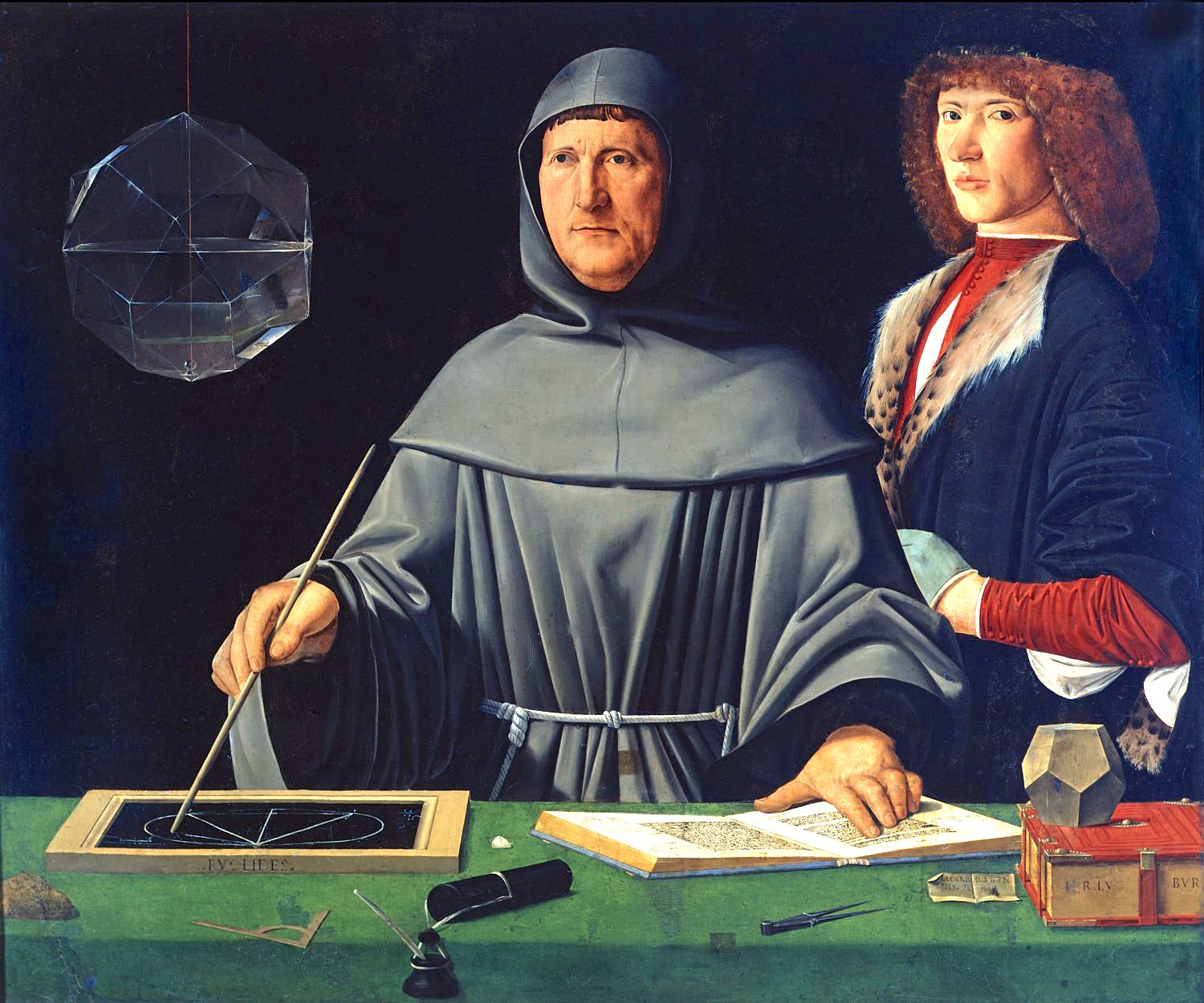
Luca Pacioli, here in a 1495 portrait by an Jacopo de' Barbari, wrote on accounting ethics in 1494.

Luca Pacioli, the "Father of Accounting", wrote on accounting ethics in his first book Summa de arithmetica, geometria, proportioni, et proportionalita, published in 1494. Ethical standards have since then been developed through government groups, professional organizations, and independent companies. These various groups have led accountants to follow several codes of ethics to perform their duties in a professional work environment. Accountants must follow the code of ethics set out by the professional body of which they are a member. United States accounting societies such as the Association of Government Accountants, Institute of Internal Auditors, and the National Association of Accountants all have codes of ethics, and many accountants are members of one or more of these societies.

In 1887, the American Association of Public Accountants (AAPA) was created; it was the first step in developing professionalism in the United States accounting industry. By 1905, the AAPA's first ethical codes were formulated to educate its members. During its twentieth anniversary meeting in October 1907, ethics was a major topic of the conference among its members. As a result of discussions, a list of professional ethics was incorporated into the organization's bylaws. However, because membership to the organization was voluntary, the association could not require individuals to conform to the suggested behaviors. Other accounting organizations, such as the Illinois Institute of Accountants, also pursued discussion on the importance of ethics for the field. The AAPA was renamed several times throughout its history, before becoming the American Institute of Certified Public Accountants (AICPA) as it is named today. The AICPA developed five divisions of ethical principles that its members should follow: "independence, integrity, and objectivity"; "competence and technical standards"; "responsibilities to clients"; "responsibilities to colleagues"; as well as "other responsibilities and practices". Each of these divisions provided guidelines on how a Certified Public Accountant (CPA) should act as a professional. Failure to comply with the guidelines could have caused an accountant to be barred from practicing. When developing the ethical principles, the AICPA also considered how the profession would be viewed by those outside of the accounting industry.

== Teaching ethics ==
Courses on this subject have grown significantly in the last couple of decades. Teaching accountants about ethics can involve role playing, lectures, case studies, guest lectures, as well as other mediums. Recent studies indicate that nearly all accounting textbooks touch on ethics in some way. In 1993, the first United States center that focused on the study of ethics in the accounting profession opened at Binghamton University. Starting in 1999, several U.S. states began requiring ethics classes prior to taking the CPA exam.

Seven goals of accounting ethics education

- Relate accounting education to moral issues.
- Recognize issues in accounting that have ethical implications.
- Develop "a sense of moral obligation" or responsibility.
- Develop the abilities needed to deal with ethical conflicts or dilemmas.
- Learn to deal with the uncertainties of the accounting profession.
- "Set the stage for" a change in ethical behavior.
- Appreciate and understand the history and composition of all aspects of accounting ethics and their relationship to the general field of ethics. —Stephen E. Loeb

In 1988, Stephen E. Loeb proposed that accounting ethics education should include seven goals (adapted from a list by Daniel Callahan). To implement these goals, he pointed out that accounting ethics could be taught throughout accounting curriculum or in an individual class tailored to the subject. Requiring it be taught throughout the curriculum would necessitate all accounting teachers to have knowledge on the subject (which may require training). A single course has issues as to where to include the course in a student's education (for example, before preliminary accounting classes or near the end of a student's degree requirements), whether there is enough material to cover in a semester class, and whether most universities have room in a four-year curriculum for a single class on the subject.

There has been debate on whether ethics should be taught in a university setting. Supporters point out that ethics are important to the profession, and should be taught to accountants entering the field. In addition, the education would help to reinforce students' ethical values and inspire them to prevent others from making unethical decisions. Critics argue that an individual is ethical or not, and that teaching an ethics course would serve no purpose. Despite opposition, instruction on accounting ethics by universities and conferences, has been encouraged by professional organizations and accounting firms. The Accounting Education Change Commission (AECC) has called for students to "know and understand the ethics of the profession and be able to make value-based judgments."

Phillip G. Cottel argued that in order to uphold strong ethics, an accountant "must have a strong sense of values, the ability to reflect on a situation to determine the ethical implications, and a commitment to the well-being of others." Iris Stuart recommends an ethics model consisting of four steps: the accountant must recognize that an ethical dilemma is occurring; identify the parties that would be interested in the outcome of the dilemma; determine alternatives and evaluate its effect on each alternative on the interested parties; and then select the best alternative.

== Emerging issues ==
Recent research has emphasized that accountants are increasingly expected to address ethical questions related not only to financial reporting but also to broader concerns such as sustainability, environmental, social and governance (ESG) reporting, and the use of artificial intelligence in auditing. These developments have expanded the scope of accounting ethics beyond traditional concerns with fraud and compliance, requiring professional judgment in new and evolving contexts.

== Accounting scandals ==
Accounting ethics has been deemed difficult to control as accountants and auditors must consider the interest of the public (which relies on the information gathered in audits) while ensuring that they remained employed by the company they are auditing. They must consider how to best apply accounting standards even when faced with issues that could cause a company to face a significant loss or even be discontinued. Due to several accounting scandals within the profession, critics of accountants have stated that when asked by a client "what does two plus two equal?" the accountant would be likely to respond "what would you like it to be?". This thought process along with other criticisms of the profession's issues with conflict of interest, have led to various increased standards of professionalism while stressing ethics in the work environment.

The role of accountants is critical to society. Accountants serve as financial reporters and intermediaries in the capital markets and owe their primary obligation to the public interest. The information they provide is crucial in aiding managers, investors and others in making critical economic decisions. Accordingly, ethical improprieties by accountants can be detrimental to society, resulting in distrust by the public and disruption of efficient capital market operations.

"Every company in the country is fiddling its profits. Every set of published accounts is based on books which have been gently cooked or completely roasted. The figures which are fed twice a year to the investing public have all been changed in order to protect the guilty. It is the biggest con trick since the Trojan horse. ... In fact this deception is all in perfectly good taste. It is totally legitimate. It is creative accounting."

— Ian Griffiths in 1986, describing creative accounting

From the 1980s to the present there have been multiple accounting scandals that were widely reported on by the media and resulted in fraud charges, bankruptcy protection requests, and the closure of companies and accounting firms. The scandals were the result of creative accounting, misleading financial analysis, as well as bribery. Various companies had issues with fraudulent accounting practices, including Nugan Hand Bank, Phar-Mor, WorldCom, and AIG. One of the most widely reported violation of accounting ethics involved Enron, a multinational company, that for several years had not shown a true or fair view of their financial statements. Their auditor Arthur Andersen, an accounting firm considered one of the "Big Five", signed off on the validity of the accounts despite the inaccuracies in the financial statements. When the unethical activities were reported, not only did Enron dissolve but Arthur Andersen also went out of business. Enron's shareholders lost $25 billion as a result of the company's bankruptcy. Although only a fraction of Arthur Anderson's employees were involved with the scandal, the closure of the firm resulted in the loss of 85,000 jobs.

=== Causes ===
Fraudulent accounting can arise from a variety of issues. These problems usually come to light eventually and could ruin not only the company but also the auditors for not discovering or revealing the misstatements. Several studies have proposed that a firm's corporate culture as well as the values it stresses may negatively alter an accountant's behavior. This environment could contribute to the degradation of ethical values that were learned from universities.

Until 1977, ethics rules prevented accounting and auditing firms from advertising to clients. When the rules were lifted, spending by the largest CPA firms on advertisements rose from US$4 million in the 1980s to more than $100 million in the 2000s. Critics claimed that, by allowing the firms to advertise, the business side overstepped the professional side of the profession, which led to a conflict of interest. This focus allowed for occurrences of fraud, and caused the firms, according to Arthur Bowman, "... to offer services that made them more consultants and business advisers than auditors." As accounting firms became less interested in the lower-paying audits due to more focus on higher earning services such as consulting, problems arose. This disregard for the lack of time spent on audits resulted in a lack of attention to catching creative and fraudulent accounting.

A 2007 article in Managerial Auditing Journal determined the top nine factors that contributed to ethical failures for accountants based on a survey of 66 members of the International Federation of Accountants. The factors include (in order of most significant): "self-interest, failure to maintain objectivity and independence, inappropriate professional judgment, lack of ethical sensitivity, improper leadership and ill-culture, failure to withstand advocacy threats, lack of competence, lack of organizational and peer support, and lack of professional body support." The main factor, self-interest, is the motivation by an accountant to act in his/her best interest or when facing a conflict of interest. For example, if an auditor has an issue with an account he/she is auditing, but is receiving financial incentives to ignore these issues, the auditor may act unethically.

==== Principles and rules ====
"When people need a doctor, or a lawyer, or a certified public accountant, they seek someone whom they can trust to do a good job — not for himself, but for them. They have to trust him, since they cannot appraise the quality of his 'product'. To trust him they must believe that he is competent, and that his primary motive is to help them."

— John L. Carey, describing ethics in accounting

The International Financial Reporting Standards (IFRS) are standards and interpretations developed by the International Accounting Standards Board, which are principle-based. IFRS are used by over 115 countries or areas including the European Union, Australia, and Hong Kong. The United States Generally Accepted Accounting Principles (GAAP), the standard framework of guidelines for financial accounting, is largely rule-based. Critics have stated that the rules-based GAAP is partly responsible for the number of scandals that the United States has suffered. The principles-based approach to monitoring requires more professional judgment than the rules-based approach.

There are many stakeholders in many countries such as The United States who report several concerns in the usage of rules-based accounting. According to recent studies, many believe that the principles-based approach in financial reporting would not only improve but would also support an auditor upon dealing with client's pressure. As a result, financial reports could be viewed with fairness and transparency. When the U.S. switched to International accounting standards, they are composed that this would bring change. However, as a new chairperson of the SEC takes over the system, the transition brings a stronger review about the pros and cons of rules- based accounting. While the move towards international standards progresses, there are small amount of research that examines the effect of principle- based standards in an auditor's decision- making process. According to 114 auditing experts, most are willing to allow clients to manage their net income based on rules- based standards. These results offers insight to the SEC, IASB and FASB in weighing the arguments in the debate of principles- vs. rules based- accounting.

IFRS is based on "understandability, relevance, materiality, reliability, and comparability". Since IFRS has not been adopted by all countries, these practices do not make the international standards viable in the world domain. In particular, the United States has not yet conformed and still uses GAAP which makes comparing principles and rules difficult. In August 2008, the Securities and Exchange Commission (SEC) proposed that the United States switch from GAAP to IFRS, starting in 2014.

=== Responses to scandals ===
Since the major accounting scandals, new reforms, regulations, and calls for increased higher education have been introduced to combat the dangers of unethical behavior. By educating accountants on ethics before entering the workforce, such as through higher education or initial training at companies, it is believed it will help to improve the credibility of the accounting profession. Companies and accounting organizations have expanded their assistance with educators by providing education materials to assist professors in educating students.

New regulations in response to the scandals include the Corporate Law Economic Reform Program Act 2004 in Australia as well as the Sarbanes-Oxley Act of 2002, developed by the United States. Sarbanes-Oxley limits the level of work which can be carried out by accounting firms. In addition, the Act put a limit on the fee which a firm can receive from one client as a percentage of their total fees. This ensures that companies are not wholly reliant on one firm for its income, in the hope that they do not need to act unethically to keep a steady income. The act also protects whistleblowers and requires senior management in public companies to sign off on the accuracy of its company's accounting records. In 2002, the five members of the Public Oversight Board (POB), which oversaw ethics within the accounting profession, resigned after critics deemed the board ineffective and the SEC proposed developing a new panel, the Public Company Accounting Oversight Board (PCAOB). The PCAOB was developed through the Act, and replaced the POB.

In 2003, the International Federation of Accountants (IFAC) released a report entitled Rebuilding Public Confidence in Financial Reporting: An International Perspective. By studying the international company collapses as a result of accounting issues, it determined areas for improvement within organizations as well as recommendations for companies to develop more effective ethics codes. The report also recommended that companies pursue options that would improve training and support so accountants could better handle ethical dilemmas. A collaborative effort by members of the international financial regulatory community led by Michel Prada, Chairman of the French Financial Markets Authority, resulting in establishment of the Public Interest Oversight Board (PIOB) on 1 March 2005. The PIOB provides oversight of the IFAC standards-setting boards: the International Auditing and Assurance Standards Board (IAASB), the International Accounting Education Standards Board (IAESB) and the International Ethics Standards Board for Accountants (IESBA).

The most recent reform came into effect in July 2010 when President Obama signed "The Dodd-Frank Wall Street Reform and Consumer Protection Act". The act covers a broad range of changes. The highlights of the legislation are consumer protections with authority and independence, ends too big to fail bail outs, advance warning system, transparency and accountability for exotic instruments, executive compensation and corporate governance, protects investors, and enforces regulations on the books. The legislation also resulted in the Office of the Whistleblower, which was established to administer the SEC's whistleblower program. Congress authorized the SEC to provide monetary awards to whistleblowers who come forward with information that results in a minimum of a $1,000,000 sanction. The rewards are between 10% and 30% of the dollar amount collected. Whistleblowers help identify fraud and other unethical behaviors early on. The result is less harm to investors, quickly holding offenders responsible, and to maintain the integrity of the U.S. markets.
