= Paganino Paganini =

Italian printer and publisher

- Born: c. 1450; Brescia, Republic of Venice
- Died: 1538; Toscolano, Republic of Venice
- Citizenship: Republic of Venice
- Occupation: Publisher
- Notable work: Summa de arithmetica De divina proportione 1537 Venice Quran
- Children: Alessandro Paganini

Paganino Paganini (Italian: [paɡaˈniːno paɡaˈniːni]; Latin: Paganinus de Paganinis; c. 1450–1538), was an Italian printer and publisher from the Republic of Venice during the Renaissance. He was the original publisher of Luca Pacioli's mathematical works, Summa de arithmetica and De divina proportione, and of what is thought to be the first printed version of the Quran in Arabic.

== Life ==
Born in Brescia in the mid-fifteenth century, Paganini moved to Venice at a young age. In Venice he entered the field of publishing in 1483, working with publishers Bernardino Benali and Giorgio Arrivabene. In 1487 he printed and published his first independent work, a copy of the Roman Missal (published for the first time in 1474). In the following years he devoted himself to the printing of various works on theology and jurisprudence, including an exceptional Bible with accompanying illustrations and commentary by Nicholas of Lyra. His publications also included significant works on mathematics and politics.

In 1517 he returned with his son Alessandro and his wife to Brescia, where he founded his own print shop in the monastery on Isola del Garda; he later settled in the town of Toscolano, which today is part of the municipality of Toscolano-Maderno. Here he continued his collaboration with his son, also a printer and publisher, printing numerous Latin and Italian classics in small format. In his later years he moved to the town of Cecina, also currently part of Toscolano-Maderno, where he died in 1538.

== Notable works ==
Among Paganini's most notable publications were three mathematical writings of Luca Pacioli: Pacioli's Summa de arithmetica (1494), De divina proportione (1509), and his Italian translation of Euclid's Elements (1509). He also published Vergerio's De Republica Veneta liber primus in 1526, contributing to the work's influence on Venetian politics in the early sixteenth century.

=== First printed Arabic Quran ===
Between 1537 and 1538 Paganini and his son published what was probably the first printed edition of the Quran in Arabic. This work was likely intended for export to the Ottoman Empire, with which Venice had extensive trade ties. Sometimes known as the Paganini Quran, the Venice Quran, or the Venice Manuscript, it is believed to be the first complete copy of the Quran printed on a movable type printer. In the end, the venture was unsuccessful; the entire print run is reported by various contemporaries to have been lost, though the explanations for the disappearance vary widely. However, one copy of this printed Quran was found in 1987 in a monastery in Isola di San Michele (Venice).
