= Honourable Merchant =

Honourable Merchant (German Ehrbarer Kaufmann) describes the historically grown model for responsible participants in business life in Europe. It stands for a pronounced sense of responsibility for one's own company, for society and for the environment. An honorable businessman bases his conduct on virtues which aim at long-term economic success without opposing the interests of society. He operates sustainably.

== Theory ==
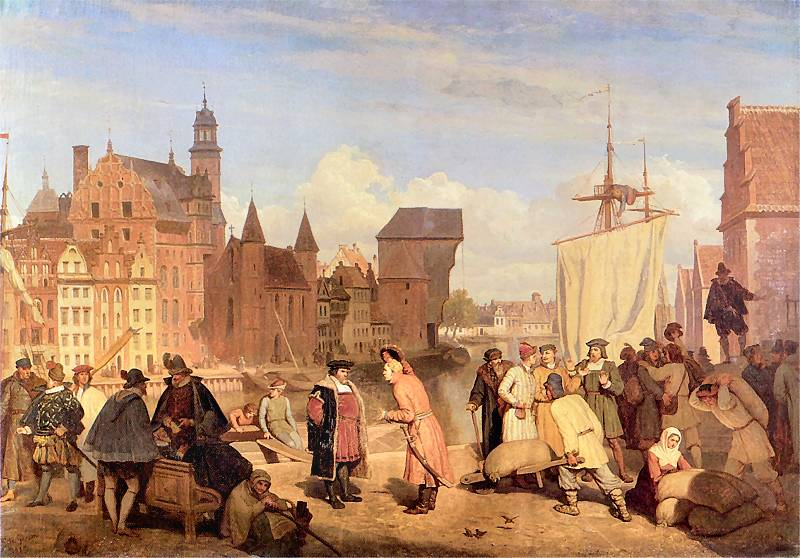
Merchants at Gdańsk harbour in the 17th century

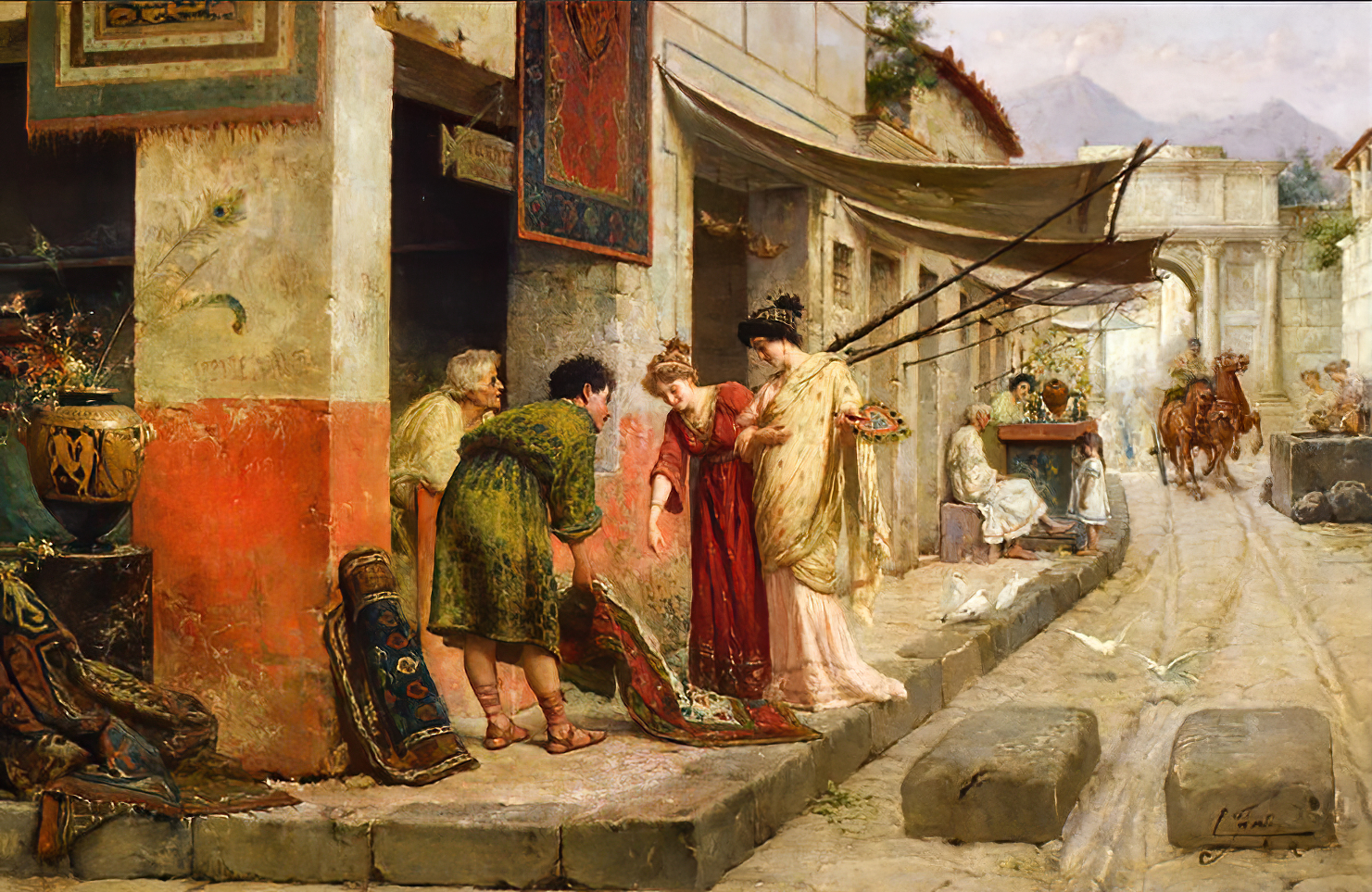
Merchant in Pompeii by Eduardo Ettore Forti before 1897

The Honourable Businessman stands as a model for the optimally acting economic subject.

In literature there are many synonyms for the attribute honorable. To be named are the true, good, genuine, honorable, honest, moral, ideal, ethical or moral acting and even the royal merchant. The term honor is not an absolute term. It is strongly subject to historical change. An exact definition is therefore not possible. The honorable merchant must always be seen in the context of his time. Nevertheless, there is a basic framework that has determined the behaviour of honorable merchants since the Middle Ages.

== History ==
Since the 12th century, the model of the Honourable Merchant has demonstrably been taught in European merchant manuals. His European beginnings can be found in medieval Italy and the North German League of Hanseatic Cities. The model of the honourable merchant came to Italy in 1494 and is attributed to Luca Pacioli: "There is nothing higher than the word of the good merchant, and so they affirm their oaths by saying: In the honour of the true merchant".

== Criticism ==
The public criticism of the model of the Honourable Merchant refers to the assumed remoteness from reality of the model. By citing negative examples of entrepreneurs and managers, it attempts to show that respectable behaviour is of no significance in reality. Furthermore, a romanticization of the historical concept of merchant is deplored, also with reference to negative examples.

== Literature ==
- Horst Albach: Zurück zum ehrbaren Kaufmann. Zur Ökonomie der Habgier. In: WZB-Mitteilungen, 100, Berlin June 2003, German, ISSN 0174-3120, p. 37–40.
- Oswald Bauer: Der ehrbare Kaufmann und sein Ansehen. Dresden 1906, German. Steinkopf & Springer.
- Beschorner, Thomas; Hajduk, Thomas: Der ehrbare Kaufmann – Unternehmensverantwortung "light"?. In: CSR MAGAZIN (2011), German, Nr. 3, p. 6–8.
- Dagmar Burkhart: Eine Geschichte der Ehre. Darmstadt 2006, Wissenschaftliche Buchgesellschaft, German, ISBN 3-534-18304-5.
- Josef Wieland: Wozu Wertemanagement? Ein Leitfaden für die Praxis. In: Josef Wieland (Hrsg.): Handbuch Werte Management. Murmann, Hamburg 2004, German, ISBN 3938017066, p. 13–54.
- Wegmann/Zeibig/Zilkens: Der ehrbare Kaufmann, Leistungsfaktor Vertrauen – Kostenfaktor Misstrauen, ISBN 978-3-86556-233-3, German, Cologne, 2009.

== See also ==
- Merchant
- Economy
- Entrepreneur
