= Summa de arithmetica =

Renaissance mathematics textbook

Summa de arithmetica, geometria, proportioni et proportionalita
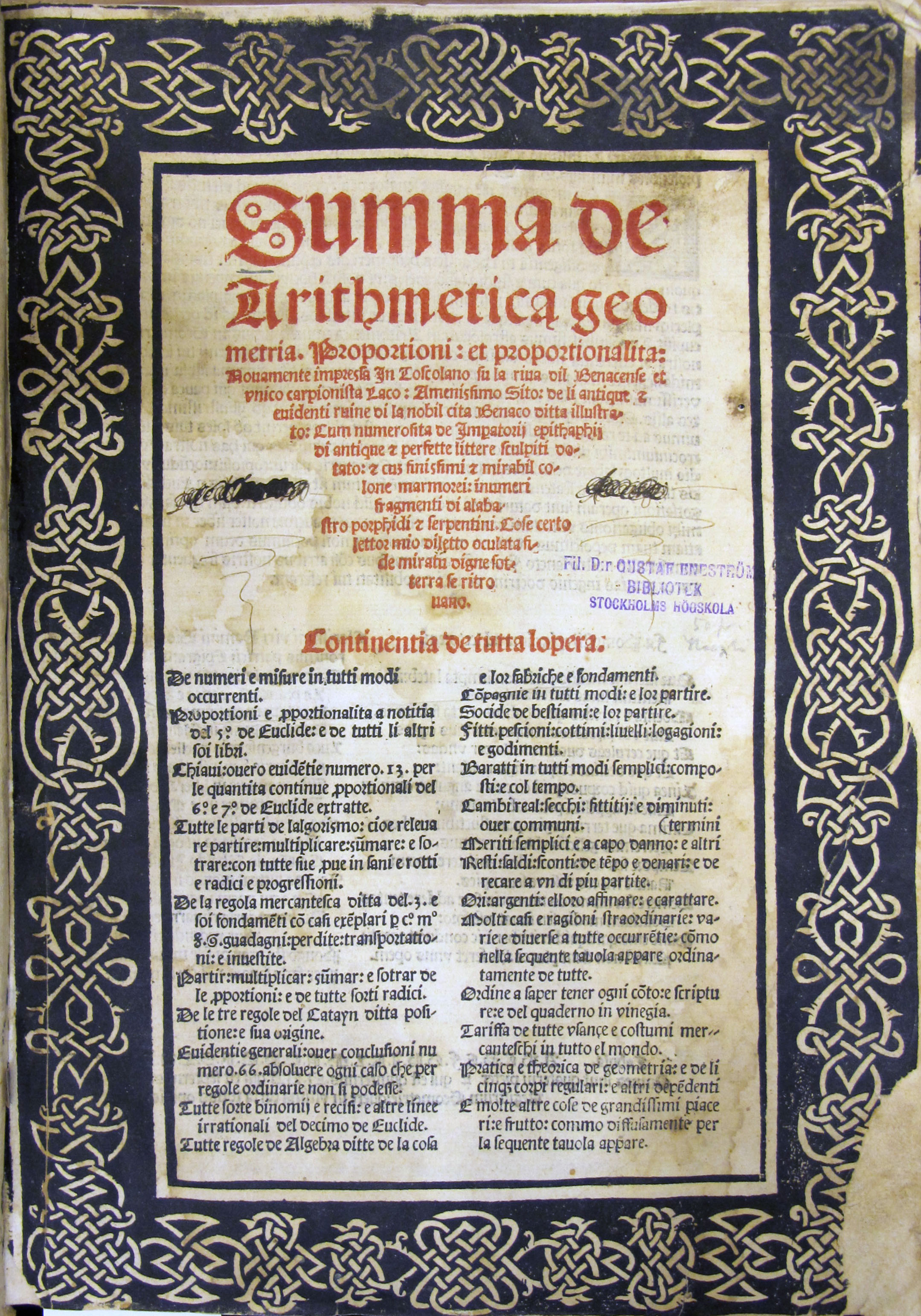
- Title page of the second (1523) edition
- Author: Luca Pacioli
- Language: Italian
- Subjects: Mathematics, Accounting
- Publisher: Paganini (Venice)
- Publication date: 1494
- Publication place: Republic of Venice
- Pages: 615 pp (first edition)

Summa de arithmetica, geometria, proportioni et proportionalita (Summary of arithmetic, geometry, proportions and proportionality) is a book on mathematics written by Luca Pacioli and first published in 1494. It contains a comprehensive summary of Renaissance mathematics, including practical arithmetic, basic algebra, basic geometry and accounting, written for use as a textbook and reference work.

Written in vernacular Italian, the Summa is the first printed work on algebra, and it contains the first published description of the double-entry bookkeeping system, which had been invented in the 13th century but was not yet widely known. It set a new standard for writing and argumentation about algebra, and its impact upon the subsequent development and standardization of professional accounting methods was so great that Pacioli is sometimes referred to as the "father of accounting".

== Contents ==
The Summa de arithmetica as originally printed consists of ten chapters on a series of mathematical topics, collectively covering essentially all of Renaissance mathematics. The first seven chapters form a summary of arithmetic in 222 pages. The eighth chapter explains contemporary algebra in 78 pages. The ninth chapter discusses various topics relevant to business and trade, including barter, bills of exchange, weights and measures and bookkeeping, in 150 pages. The tenth and final chapter describes practical geometry (including basic trigonometry) in 151 pages.

The book's mathematical content draws heavily on the traditions of the abacus schools of contemporary northern Italy, where the children of merchants and the middle class studied arithmetic on the model established by Fibonacci's Liber Abaci. The emphasis of this tradition was on facility with computation, using the Hindu–Arabic numeral system, developed through exposure to numerous example problems and case studies drawn principally from business and trade. Pacioli's work likewise teaches through examples, but it also develops arguments for the validity of its solutions through reference to general principles, axioms and logical proof. In this way the Summa begins to reintegrate the logical methods of classical Greek geometry into the medieval discipline of algebra.

=== Bookkeeping and finance ===
Within the chapter on business, a section entitled Particularis de computis et scripturis (Details of calculation and recording) describes the accounting methods then in use among northern-Italian merchants, including double-entry bookkeeping, trial balances, balance sheets and various other tools still employed by professional accountants. The business chapter also introduces the rule of 72 for predicting an investment's future value, anticipating the development of the logarithm by more than century. These techniques did not originate with Pacioli, who merely recorded and explained the established best practices of contemporary businesspeople in his region.

=== Plagiarism controversy ===
Pacioli explicitly states in the Summa that he contributed no original mathematical content to the work, but he also does not specifically attribute any of the material to other sources. Subsequent scholarship has found that much of the work's coverage of geometry is taken almost exactly from Piero della Francesca’s Trattato d’abaco, one of the algebra sections is based on the Trattato di Fioretti of Antonio de Mazzinghi, and a portion of the business chapter is copied from a manuscript by Giorgio Chiarini. This sort of appropriation has led some historians (notably including sixteenth-century biographer Giorgio Vasari) to accuse Pacioli of plagiarism in the Summa (and other works). Many of the problems and techniques included in the book are quite directly taken from these earlier works, but the Summa generally adds original logical arguments to justify the validity of the methods.

== History ==
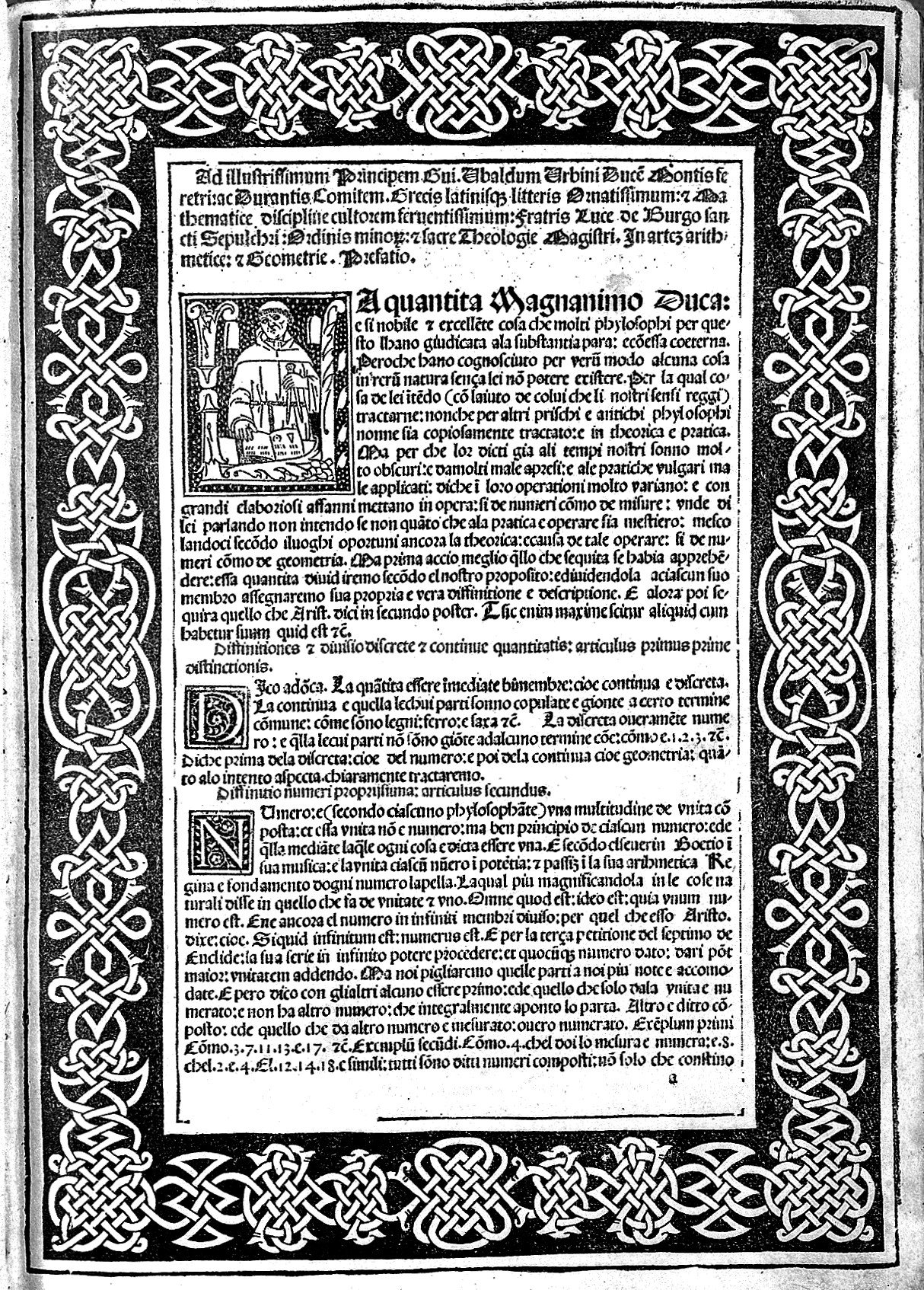
Dedication page of the first (1494) edition

Summa de arithmetica was composed over a period of decades through Pacioli's work as a professor of mathematics, and was probably intended as a textbook and reference work for students of mathematics and business, especially among the mercantile middle class of northern Italy. It was written in vernacular Italian (rather than Latin), reflecting its target audience and its purpose as a teaching text. The work was dedicated to Guidobaldo da Montefeltro, Duke of Urbino, a patron of the arts whom Pacioli had met in Rome some years earlier.

It was originally published in Venice in 1494 by Paganino Paganini, with an identical second edition printed in 1523 in Toscolano. About a thousand copies were originally printed, of which roughly 120 are still extant. In June 2019, an intact first edition sold at auction for US$1,215,000.

== Impact and legacy ==
While the Summa contained little or no original mathematical work by Pacioli, it was the most comprehensive mathematical text ever published at the time. Its thoroughness and clarity (and the lack of any other similar work available in print) generated strong and steady sales to the European merchants who were the text's intended audience. The reputation the Summa earned Pacioli as a mathematician and intellectual inspired Ludovico Sforza, Duke of Milan, to invite him to serve as a mathematical lecturer in the ducal court, where Pacioli befriended and collaborated with Leonardo da Vinci.

The Summa represents the first published description of many accounting techniques, including double-entry bookkeeping. Some of the same methods were described in other manuscripts predating the Summa (such as the 1458 Della mercatura e del mercante perfetto by Benedetto Cotrugli), but none was published before Pacioli's work, and none achieved the same wide influence. The work's role in standardizing and disseminating professional bookkeeping methods has earned Pacioli a reputation as the "father of accounting".

The book also marks the beginning of a movement in sixteenth-century algebra toward the use of logical argumentation and theorems in the study of algebra, following the model of classical Greek geometry established by Euclid. It is thought to be the first printed work on algebra, and it includes the first printed example of a set of plus and minus signs that were to become standard in Italian Renaissance mathematics: 'p' with a tilde above (p̄) for "plus" and 'm' with a tilde (m̄) for minus. Pacioli's (incorrect) assertion in the Summa that there was no general solution to cubic equations helped to popularize the problem among contemporary mathematicians, contributing to its subsequent solution by Niccolò Tartaglia.

=== Commemoration ===
In 1994 Italy issued a 750-lira postage stamp honoring the 500th anniversary of the Summa's publication, depicting Pacioli surrounded by mathematical and geometric implements. The image on the stamp was inspired by the Portrait of Luca Pacioli and contains many of the same elements.

== See also ==
- De divina proportione, another influential mathematical work by Pacioli
- List of most expensive books and manuscripts
