= Benedetto Cotrugli =

Ragusan merchant, economist, scientist, diplomat and humanist

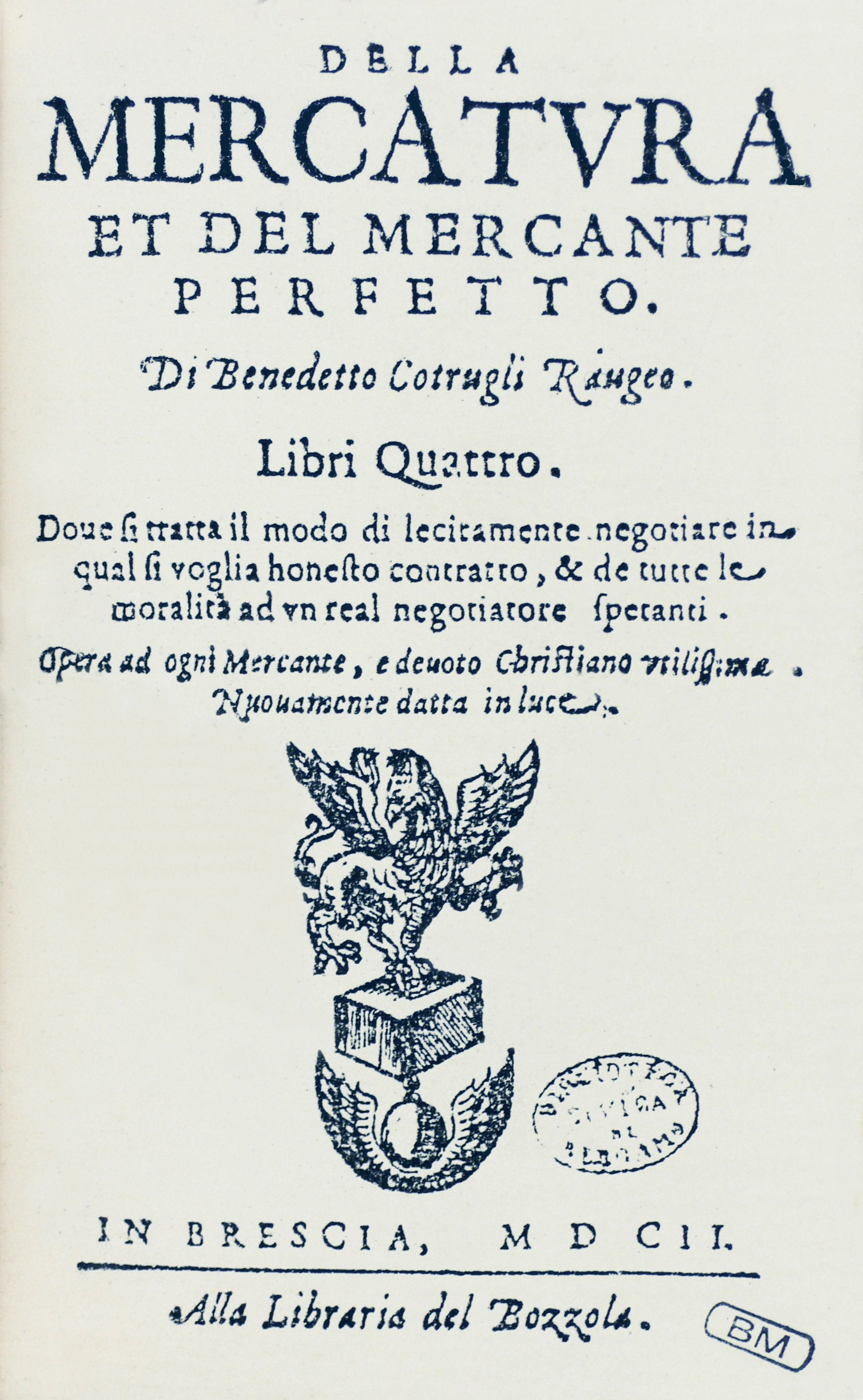
Della mercatura, 1602.

Benedetto Cotrugli (Croatian: Benedikt "Beno" Kotruljević; 1416–1469) was a Ragusan merchant, economist, scientist, diplomat and humanist.

== Life ==
Cotrugli was born in the city of Ragusa (modern Dubrovnik), part of the Republic of Ragusa. As a diplomat of the Kingdom of Naples, he spent some 15 years in the Court of Naples where he led many discussions and polished his thoughts on humanist subjects. From 1451 until 1469 he lived in Naples. He died in Aquila.

== Surviving manuscripts ==
The earliest extant copy of Cotrugli's manuscript Libro de l'Arte de la Mercatura (Book on the Art of Trade) is kept in the National Library of Malta and is dated 1475, although the original manuscript was dated 1458.

The text of his 1458 manuscript Della mercatura e del mercante perfetto is followed by an appendix containing an inventory and many journal entries. It contains an early description of the double-entry bookkeeping system, predating the description made by Luca Pacioli in his Summa de arithmetica of 1494.

== Heritage ==
In 2007 the Croatian state devoted a silver 150 kuna commemorative coin to Cotrugli.

Cotrugli is the patron of the Cotrugli Business school, with branches in Zagreb, Belgrade, and Ljubljana.

== Bibliography ==
- B.Cotrugli, "Il libro dell'arte di mercatura", Guerini Next, september 2022
- B.Cotrugli, "Arricchirsi con onore", edited by Alessandro Wagner, introduction by Brunello Cucinelli, Rizzoli, May 2018
- B.Cotrugli, The Book of the Art of Trade, edited by Carlo Carraro and Giovanni Favero, with Scholarly Essays from Niall Ferguson, Giovanni Favero, Mario Infelise, Tiziano Zanato and Vera Ribaudo, translated in English by John Francis Phillimore, Springer Nature, Palgrave Macmillan, 2017
- B. Cotrugli, Libro de l'arte de la mercatura, critical edition of the original Italian manuscript, by Vera Ribaudo, Cà Foscari University Press, Venice, May 2016
