= Portrait of Luca Pacioli =

Painting by Jacopo de' Barbari

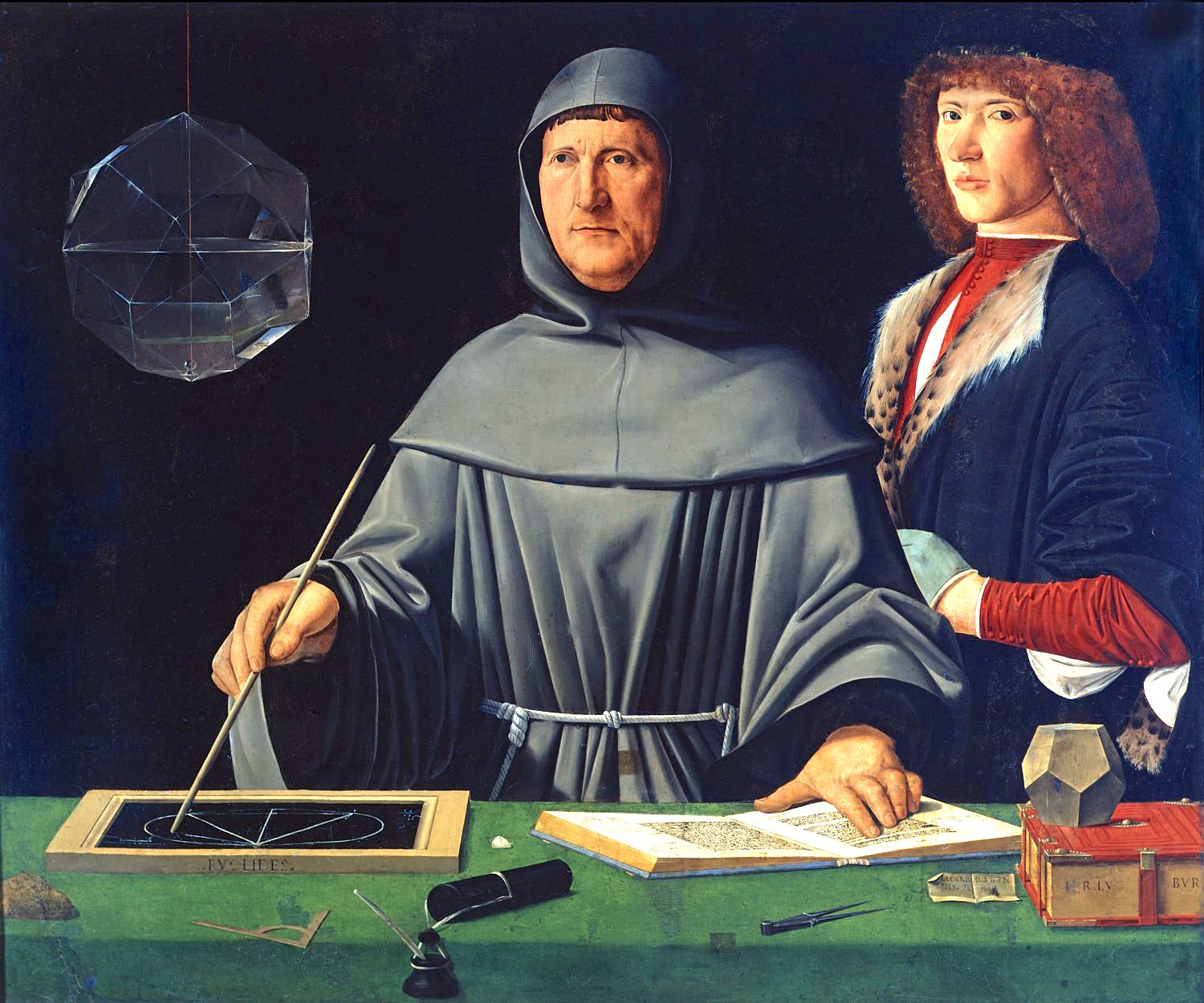
- Artist: Attributed to Jacopo de' Barbari
- Year: c. 1495–1500
- Medium: Tempera on panel
- Dimensions: 99 cm × 120 cm (39 in × 47 in)
- Location: Capodimonte Museum, Naples

The Portrait of Luca Pacioli is a painting attributed to the Italian Renaissance artist Jacopo de' Barbari, dating to around 1500 and housed in the Capodimonte Museum, Naples, southern Italy. The painting portrays the Renaissance mathematician Luca Pacioli and may have been (at least partially) painted by his collaborator Leonardo da Vinci. The person on the right has not been identified conclusively, but could be the German painter Albrecht Dürer, whom Barbari met between 1495 and 1500.

== History ==
The painting is mentioned for the first time in a 1631 inventory of the Ducal Palace of Urbino. It was later moved to Florence through Vittoria della Rovere-Medici, belonging to both the reigning dynasties of Urbino and Tuscany. The painting reappeared in the 19th century, as a property of the Ottaviano branch of the Medicis. It was subsequently acquired by the Italian state to prevent its being sold to England.

== Attribution ==
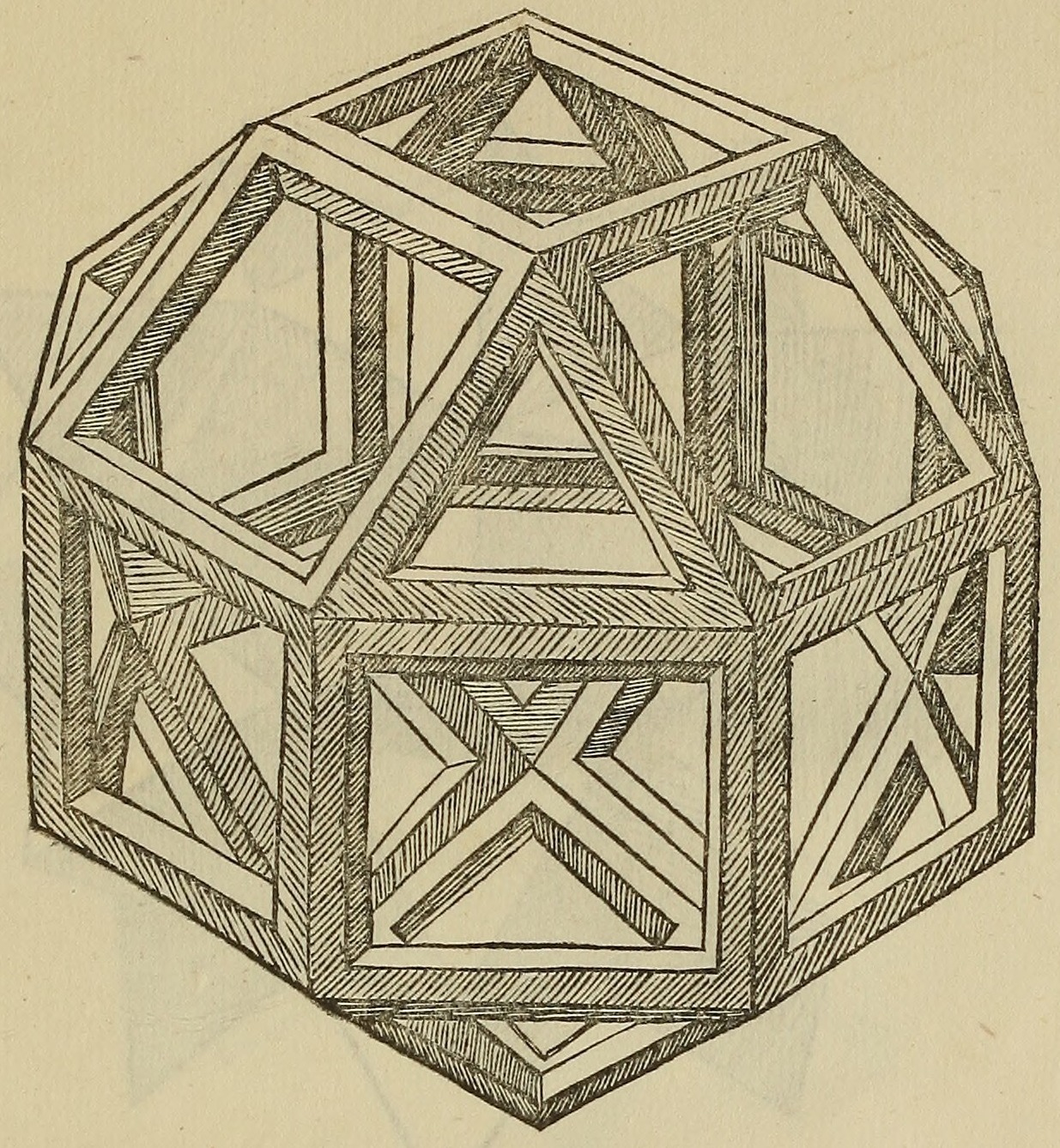
Leonardo da Vinci's illustration of a rhombicuboctahedron in Divina proportione (1509)

The painting has been generally attributed to Jacopo de' Barbari due to the presence of a cartouche with the inscription IACO.BAR. VIGENNIS. P. 1495, but the attribution to the Venetian painter has been questioned. Some attribute the painting to Leonardo da Vinci, who began collaborating with Pacioli when the latter moved to Milan in 1496. For the next two years, Leonardo illustrated Archimedean solids, including the rhombicuboctahedron, in Pacioli's Divina proportione. According to one scholar, in the rhombicuboctahedron featured in the portrait "we surely see the ineffable left hand of Leonardo da Vinci, who drew the superb pictures for De divina proportione, which, moreover, hang from a string in the originals." The same source points out that the dodecahedron in the portrait seems to be drawn by a less-skilled hand, implying that the portrait was created over multiple sittings and possibly by more than one artist. Leonardo records that on 3 August 1504, "Jacopo the German came to live with me in the house."

== Description ==
The painting portrays the friar and mathematician with a table filled with geometrical tools: slate, chalk, compass, a dodecahedron model. A rhombicuboctahedron, half-filled with water and characterized by a detailed triple reflection effect of the Ducal Palace of Urbino, is suspended from the ceiling. Pacioli is demonstrating a theorem by Euclid written in an open book. The closed book, with the inscription LI.RI.LUC.BUR. ('Liber reverendi Luca Burgensis') is supposed to be his Summary of arithmetic, geometry, proportions and proportionality (1494).

The researcher Glori in 2020 published her ten-years research focused on the cartouche with the inscription IACO.BAR.VIGENNIS P.1495, where she summarizes the methodological path followed in order to prove the scientificity of the decryption of the mysterious cryptogram (see External link to Academia edu).

== The identification of the learner ==
The person on the right has not been identified conclusively.

- According to one hypothesis, the figure on the right was identified as Guidobaldo da Montefeltro (the then Duke of Urbino who was a fervent scholar of mathematics and to whom the Summa was dedicated).

- A second hypothesis indicated Francesco di Bartolomeo Archinto (of whom a very similar portrait of Leonardesque school exists in the National Gallery, London, sometimes attributed to Marco d'Oggiono or Giovanni Ambrogio de Predis),

- The scholar Carla Glori has instead identified him in the figure of Galeazzo Sanseverino, son-in-law and dear friend of Ludovico il Moro, a leading figure at the court of Milan, as well as protector of the same fra' Luca Pacioli. The hypothesis is also based on the comparison with another portrait, the so-called Musico di Leonardo, also attributed to Galeazzo, where recurring elements are noted, such as the thick curly hair and the central slit of the farsetto in the form of a spear, symbolizing the manly power of Galeazzo in the rides. Other scholars have pointed instead to the close similarity between these two portraits and the certain ones of Galeazzo's father, Roberto Sanseverino, whose facial features show several traits in common. The reconstruction relating to the year 1495 also highlights the contacts of Luca Pacioli with his two Milanese patrons (Ludovico and Galeazzo) and Leonardo, and in any case assumes that already in February 1496 the collaboration for the "De Divina Proportione" was underway and the mathematical friar was a guest in the house of Porta Vercellina di Galeazzo himself (which he had from Pacioli, together with Duke Ludovico, the dedication of one of the three manuscript copies completed in 1498).

- He could be the German painter Albrecht Dürer. As early as his first trip to Italy (1494–1495), Dürer became aware of theories of proportion put forth by Barbari. According to Dürer's notes, he met Barbari sometime between 1495 and 1500; Barbari in turn led Dürer to Luca Pacioli's work on mathematics and art. Dürer wrote in October 1506 (during his second trip to Italy) that he planned to ride from Venice "to Bologna to learn the secrets of the art of perspective, which a man is willing to teach me." Some of Dürer's drawings are similar to that of Pacioli's master Piero della Francesca, but Dürer may have simply encountered both artists by way of Pacioli's book Divina proportione, which Leonardo da Vinci illustrated. Some of the figures in Leonardo's Treatise on Human Proportion also inspired Dürer's Christ among the Doctors, painted in Venice in 1506.
