= Della mercatura e del mercante perfetto =

Book by Benedikt Kotruljević

Of commerce and the perfect merchant
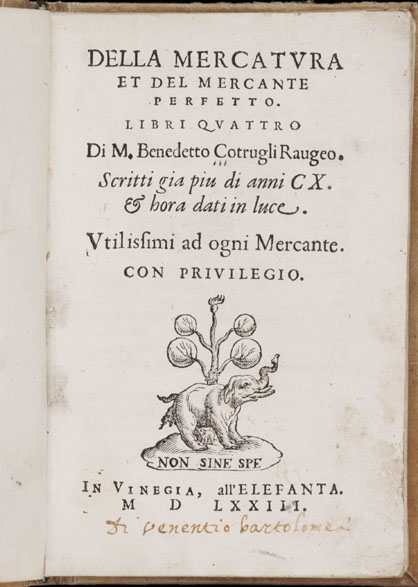
- Della mercatura e del mercante perfetto
- Author: Benedetto Cotrugli
- Language: Italian (from latin manuscript)
- Subject: Bookkeeping / Commerce
- Publisher: 'Elephant' of Venice, Italy
- Publication date: 1573
- Publication place: Republic of Ragusa (modern-day Croatia)

Della mercatura e del mercante perfetto written by Benedetto Cotrugli around 1400 was the first bookkeeping manuscript and trade manual. The title has been translated in English by the alternate names of Of commerce and the perfect merchant, On merchantry and the perfect merchant, and On trade and the perfect dealer.

== History ==
Several historians show that, since the manuscript was written in 1458, it is the oldest known manuscript on the double-entry bookkeeping system, and, as such, predates Luca Pacioli's book Summa de arithmetica by at least 36 years. It is widely thought that the reason why Luca Pacioli (1445–1517) received credit as the father of accounting is because Cotrugli's work was not officially published until 1573. An Italian version was published in Venice in 1573 by Franciscus Patricius. A French translation of this manuscript was published in Lyon in 1613 under the title "Parfait négociant."

An early copy of Della mercatura e del mercante perfetto from the end of the fifteenth century is at the National Library of Malta. Another early copy is at Biblioteca Marciana in Venice. The first English translation of the Libro de l'arte de la mercatura (The Book of the Art of Trade) edited by Carlo Carraro and Giovanni Favero, with a foreword by Niall Ferguson, Professor of History at Harvard University, has been published by Palgrave Macmillan in 2017, based on the critical edition of the original manuscripts made by Vera Ribaudo, University of Venice, published in May 2016 by Edizioni Cà Foscari, Venice.

== Manuscript content ==
The manuscript contains four books. The first is of the origin, form, and essence of being a merchant. The second talks of a merchant's religious commitment. The third is of moral virtues and policies. The fourth is administration of his home and family, and his economic matters.

At the time of the manuscript merchandising was regarded as an art. The "Perfect Merchant" or "Perfect Dealer" was a man of culture motivated to good moral conduct and honest transactions to everyone he encountered. He had to be very sensitive to local interests in places where he conducted business. He had to know how to assess the political situation and the customary laws in order to successfully conduct his business. Cotrugli wrote in his bookkeeping and merchandising trade manual that not only must a merchant be a bookkeeper-accountant, but that he must also be a good writer, a rhetorician and a man of letters being diplomatic all the while.

He contrasted the "Perfect Merchant" to sailors and soldiers by saying that they were many times naive of these points. He said they were of such dull mind that when they would drink in a tavern and buy bread at a market they often had delusions of grandeur and were not very diplomatic.

== Sources ==
- Alfieri, Vittorio (Prof.) (1891). La partita doppia applicata alle scritture delle antiche aziende mercantili veneziane (in Italian). G.B. Paravia. Original from Columbia University
- Anzovin, Steven (2000). Famous First Facts. ISBN 0-8242-0958-3.
- Hangers, Francis M. (1803). Historical-criticism on antichitla news, history and literature of 'Dubrovnik: divided into two volumes devoted Exalted and Senate of the Republic of Ragusa. Vol. 2. Martecchini.

== Bibliography ==
- B. Cotrugli, Arricchirsi con onore, edited by Alessandro Wagner, introduction by Brunello Cucinelli, Rizzoli, 2018
- B. Cotrugli, The Book of the Art of Trade, edited by Carlo Carraro and Giovanni Favero, translated in English by John Francis Phillimore, Palgrave Macmillan, Springer Nature, 2017.
- B. Cotrugli, Libro de l'arte de la mercatura, critical edition of the original Italian manuscript by Vera Ribaudo, Cà Foscari University Press, Venice, May 2016.
- Cotrugli B., Della mercatura e del mercante perfetto: libri quattro, Liber, 1975
- Cotrugli B., Il libero dell'arte della mercatura edited by U. Tucci, Arsenale, Venice 1990
- Gliubich S., Dizionario biografico degli uomini illustri della Dalmazia reprint edition of the Vienna-Zara in 1856, Arnaldo Forni Editore, Bologna 1974
- Postma J.- AJ van der Helm, Paper for the 8th World Congress of Accounting Historians, Madrid, Spain, 19–21 July 2000
