= Abacus school =

Type of Italian school or tutorial

Abacus school is a term applied to any Italian school or tutorial after the 13th century, whose commerce-directed curriculum placed special emphasis on mathematics, such as algebra, among other subjects. These schools sprang up after the publication of Fibonacci's Book of the Abacus and his introduction of the Hindu–Arabic numeral system. In Fibonacci's viewpoint, this system, originating in India around 400 BCE, and later adopted by the Arabs, was simpler and more practical than using the existing Roman numeric tradition. Italian merchants and traders quickly adopted the structure as a means of producing accountants, clerks, and so on, and subsequently abacus schools for students were established. These were done in many ways: communes could appeal to patrons to support the institution and find masters; religious institutions could finance and oversee the curriculum; independent masters could teach pupils. Unless they were selected for teaching occupations that were salaried, most masters taught students who could pay as this was their main source of income.

The words abacus or abaco refers to calculations, especially the subject of direct calculations, and does not imply the use of an abacus.

== Significance ==
Abacus schools were significant for a couple of reasons:

Firstly, because mathematics was associated with many professions, including trade, there was an increasing need to do away with the old Roman numeral system which produced too many errors. The number of Roman characters a merchant needed to memorize to carry out financial transactions as opposed to Hindu-numerals made the switch practical. Commercialists were first introduced to this new system through Leonardo Fibonacci, who came from a business family and had studied Arabic math. Being convinced of its uses, abacus schools were therefore created and dominated by wealthy merchants, with some exceptions. Sons could now be trained by the best and brightest teachers to take over their family business and the fortunate poor had more access to a variety of vocations. Morality also played a role in determining the school attendance of commoners.

Secondly, reading, writing, and some elementary math as job requirements for general occupations meant that literacy levels rose with the number of ordinary students attending institutions or being tutored at home. Sailors, for example, who wished to climb the social ladder had to present literacy and arithmetic skills on their résumé. Aspiring abbaco masters themselves need have studied only elementary, or secondary abbaco in order to teach others.

== School system ==
Italian abacus school systems differed more in their establishment than in their curriculum during the Middle Ages. For example, institutions and appointed educators were set up in a number of ways, either through commune patronage or independent masters' personal funds. Some abbaco teachers tutored privately in homes. All instructors, however, were contractually bound to their agreement which usually meant that they could supplement their salary with tuition fees or other rates. Curriculum for Abbaco masters was also universal, in that lessons were directed towards solving commercial problems. Still, these primary and secondary math schools were not to be confused with university level math subjects.

=== Establishment ===
Wealthy merchants, because of their substantial influence on public governments and their desire to educate their sons in commercial mathematics, initiated constructions of schools with the support of other parents. Communal governments then proceeded to attract abbaco masters from elsewhere, so as to avoid partiality and inevitable dispute, and to select the best according to qualification, age and salary request. They drew up contracts that specified the number of years an appointed master must work, the number of students he was allowed to teach, and the certain percentage of fees he was to return to the commune. Contracts usually ranged from twenty to thirty ducats or florins, depending on the currency used, for one to three years. In return, communes, would grant tax exemptions (full or half), rights to collect fees (tuition fees, textbook and school supply sales), and a house for personal use over and above the master's annual salary.

Independent teachers could also be hired by the commune, but for lower wages. Most times, freelance masters were contracted by a group of parents in a similar fashion to that of communal agreements, thus establishing their own school if the number of students being tutored was significant in size. Abbaco apprentices training to become masters could also tutor household children and pay for their studies simultaneously. Upon graduation, however, apprentices were required to teach elsewhere for fear of stealing the master's students and income.

=== Curriculum ===
Arithmetic, geometry, bookkeeping, reading and writing in the vernacular were the basic elementary and secondary subjects in the abbaco syllabus for most institutions, which began in the fall, Mondays through Saturdays. Although Grendler states that the hours students spent in school could be very long and lasting half a year to eight months, Merry Wiesner-Hanks takes the opposite view: boys and girls only spent half a day for up to four months. Here, Grendler may be considering the wealthy commoners and higher social classes, whereas Wiesner-Hanks may be looking at the working classes.

Mathematical problems dealt with the everyday exchange of different types of goods or monies of differing values, whether it was in demand or in good quality, and how much of it was being traded. Other problems dealt with distribution of profits, where each member invested a certain sum and may have later withdrawn a portion of that amount. Labor contracts too, where the employer agreed to a certain wage over the course of a certain term for a certain type of work that produced a specific amount of goods, but the employee decided to leave after a while, were brought up. Bookkeeping taught students to note weight, length, size and other quantitative and qualitative information of goods.

== See also ==
- Italian Renaissance
- Italy in the Middle Ages
- Mathematics
- Islamic mathematics
