= Luca Pacioli =

15th c. Franciscan Friar, mathematician and publisher of accounting treatise

Luca Pacioli OFM
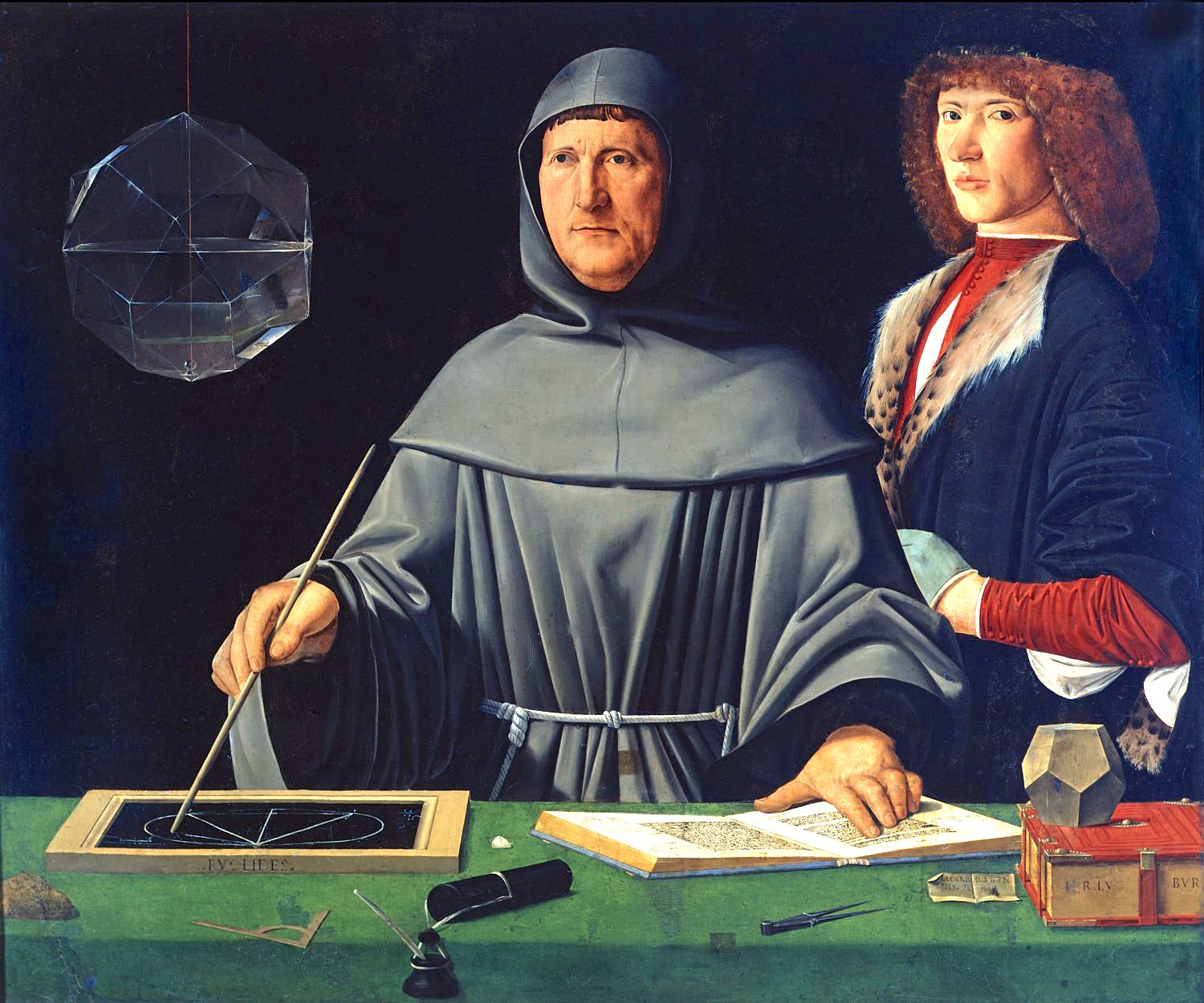
- Portrait of Luca Pacioli, traditionally attributed to Jacopo de' Barbari, 1495
- Born: c. 1447; Sansepolcro, Republic of Florence
- Died: 19 June 1517 (aged 69–70); Sansepolcro, Republic of Florence
- Occupations: Mathematician, Franciscan friar
- Known for: Summa de arithmetica, Divina proportione, double-entry bookkeeping

Luca Bartolomeo de Pacioli (sometimes Paccioli or Paciolo; c. 1447 – 19 June 1517) was an Italian mathematician, Franciscan friar, collaborator with Leonardo da Vinci, and an early contributor to the field now known as accounting. He is referred to as the father of accounting and bookkeeping and he was the first person to publish a work on the double-entry system of book-keeping on the continent. He was also called Luca di Borgo after his birthplace, Borgo Sansepolcro.

== Life ==
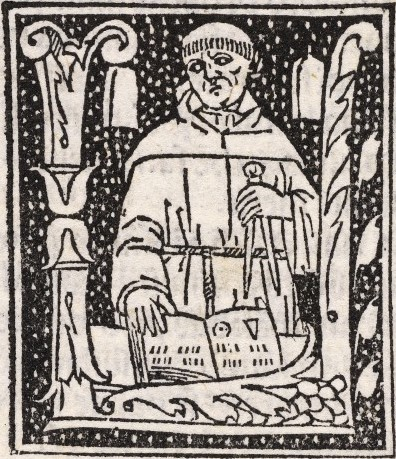
A woodcut of Pacioli which appears throughout the Summa de arithmetica

Luca Pacioli was born between 1446 and 1448 in the Tuscan town of Sansepolcro, where he received an abbaco education. This was education in the vernacular (i.e., the local tongue) rather than Latin and focused on the knowledge required of merchants. His father was Bartolomeo Pacioli; however, Luca Pacioli was said to have lived with the Befolci family as a child in his birth town Sansepolcro. He moved to Venice around 1464, where he continued his own education while working as a tutor to the three sons of a merchant. It was during this period that he wrote his first book, a treatise on arithmetic for the boys he was tutoring. Between 1472 and 1475, he became a Franciscan friar. Thus, he could be referred to as Fra ('Friar') Luca.

In 1475, he started teaching in Perugia as a private teacher before becoming first chair in mathematics in 1477. During this time, he wrote a comprehensive textbook in the vernacular for his students. He continued to work as a private tutor of mathematics and was instructed to stop teaching at this level in Sansepolcro in 1491. In 1494, his first book, Summa de arithmetica, geometria, Proportioni et proportionalita, was published in Venice. In 1497, he accepted an invitation from Duke Ludovico Sforza to work in Milan. There he met, taught mathematics to, collaborated, and lived with Leonardo da Vinci. In 1499, Pacioli and Leonardo were forced to flee Milan when Louis XII seized the city and drove out their patron. Their paths appear to have finally separated around 1506. Pacioli died at about the age of 70 on 19 June 1517, most likely in Sansepolcro, where it is thought that he had spent much of his final years.

== Mathematics ==
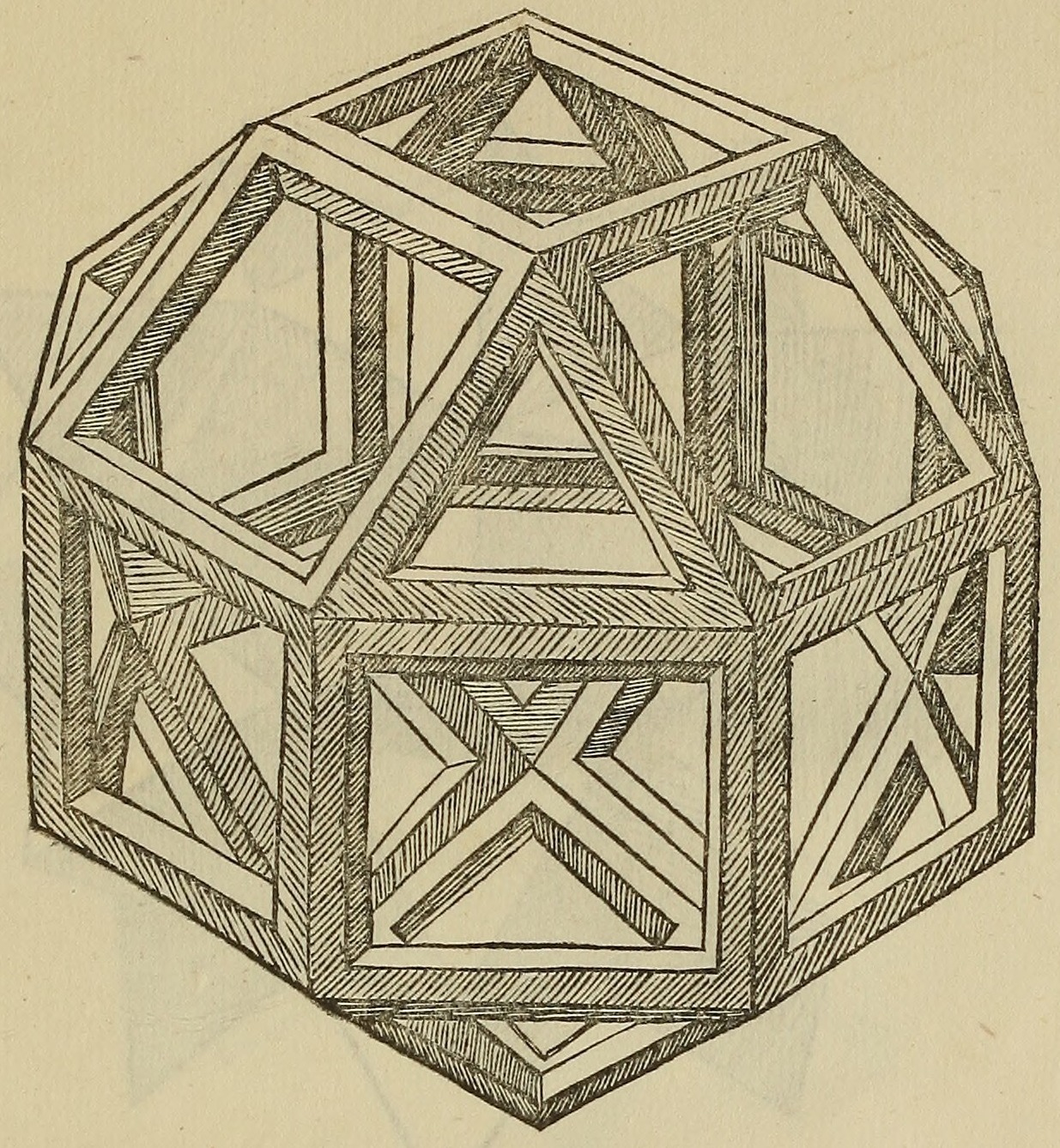
The first printed illustration of a rhombicuboctahedron, by Leonardo da Vinci, published in Divina proportione

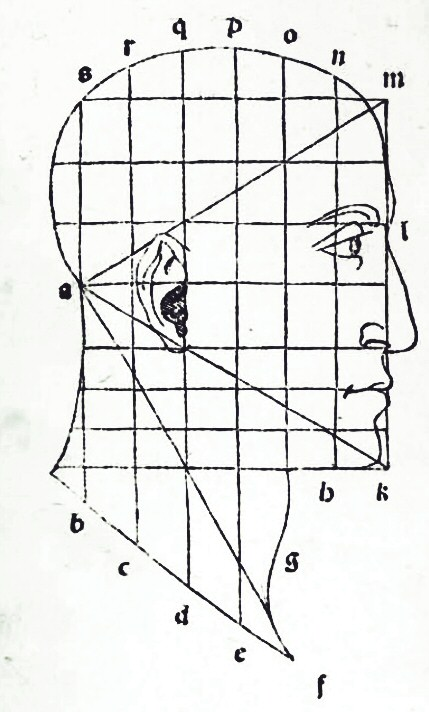
Woodcut illustrating the proportions of the human face from the second part of Divina proportione, which covers the Vitruvian system

Pacioli published several works on mathematics, including:

- Tractatus mathematicus ad discipulos perusinos (Ms. Vatican Library, Lat. 3129), a nearly 600-page textbook dedicated to his students at the University of Perugia where Pacioli taught from 1477 to 1480. The manuscript was written between December 1477 and 29 April 1478. It contains 16 sections on merchant arithmetic, such as barter, exchange, profit, mixing metals, and algebra, though 25 pages from the chapter on algebra are missing. A modern transcription was published by Calzoni and Cavazzoni (1996) along with a partial translation of the chapter on partitioning problems.
- Summa de arithmetica, geometria. Proportioni et proportionalita (Venice 1494), a textbook for use in the schools of Northern Italy. It was a synthesis of the mathematical knowledge of his time and contained the first printed work on algebra written in the vernacular (i.e., the spoken language of the day). It is also notable for including one of the first published descriptions of the bookkeeping method that Venetian merchants used during the Italian Renaissance, known as the double-entry accounting system. The system he published included most of the accounting cycle as we know it today. He described the use of journals and ledgers and warned that a person should not go to sleep at night until the debits equalled the credits. His ledger had accounts for assets (including receivables and inventories), liabilities, capital, income, and expenses – the account categories that are reported on an organization's balance sheet and income statement, respectively. He demonstrated year-end closing entries and proposed that a trial balance be used to prove a balanced ledger. Additionally, his treatise touches on a wide range of related topics from accounting ethics to cost accounting. He introduced the Rule of 72, using an approximation of 100*ln 2 more than 100 years before Napier and Briggs. Its exercises were largely copied without credit from Piero della Francesca's earlier book, Trattato d'abaco. It also disseminated symbols for plus and minus that became standard notation in mathematics during the Renaissance.
- De viribus quantitatis (Ms. Università degli Studi di Bologna, 1496–1508), a treatise on mathematics and magic. Written between 1496 and 1508, it contains the first reference to card tricks as well as guidance on how to juggle, eat fire, and make coins dance. It is the first work to note that Leonardo was left-handed. De viribus quantitatis is divided into three sections: Mathematical problems, puzzles, and tricks, along with a collection of proverbs and verses. The book has been described as the "Foundation of modern magic and numerical puzzles," but it was never published and sat in the archives of the University of Bologna, where it was seen by only a small number of scholars during the Middle Ages. The book was rediscovered after David Singmaster, a mathematician, came across a reference to it in a 19th-century manuscript. An English translation was published for the first time in 2007.
- Geometry (1509), a Latin translation of Euclid's Elements.
- Divina proportione (written in Milan in 1496–1498, published in Venice in 1509). Two versions of the original manuscript are extant, one in the Biblioteca Ambrosiana in Milan, the other in the Bibliothèque Publique et Universitaire in Geneva. The subject was mathematical and artistic proportion, especially the mathematics of the golden ratio and its application in architecture. It incorporates without credit a translation of the entire book De quinque corporibus regularibus by Piero della Francesca. Leonardo da Vinci drew the illustrations of the regular solids in Divina proportione while he lived with and took mathematics lessons from Pacioli. Leonardo's drawings are probably the first illustrations of skeletal solids, which allowed an easy distinction between front and back. The work also discusses the use of perspective by painters such as Piero della Francesca, Melozzo da Forlì, and Marco Palmezzano. (Note: The Metropolitan Museum of Art in New York City claims that the "M" logo it uses to decorate souvenir items (which the museum calls "the Renaissance M") is from an illustration originally in the Divina proportione. See "Renaissance 'M' bookmark". The Met Store (Metropolitan Museum of Art shopping catalog)..)

=== Translation of Piero della Francesca's work ===
The majority of the second volume of Summa de arithmetica, geometria. Proportioni et proportionalita was a slightly rewritten version of one of Piero della Francesca's works. The third volume of Pacioli's Divina proportione was an Italian translation of Piero della Francesca's Latin book De quinque corporibus regularibus. In neither case did Pacioli include an attribution to Piero. He was severely criticized for this and accused of plagiarism by sixteenth-century art historian and biographer Giorgio Vasari. R. Emmett Taylor (1889–1956) said that Pacioli may have had nothing to do with the translated volume Divina proportione, and that it may just have been appended to his work. However, no such defense can be presented concerning the inclusion of Piero della Francesca's material in Pacioli's Summa.

== Impact on accounting and business ==
Pacioli dramatically affected the practice of accounting by describing the double-entry accounting method used in parts of Italy. This revolutionized how businesses oversaw their operations, enabling improved efficiency and profitability. The Summa's section on accounting was used internationally as an accounting textbook up to the mid-16th century. The essentials of double-entry accounting have for the most part remained unchanged for over 500 years. "Accounting practitioners in public accounting, industry, and not-for-profit organizations, as well as investors, lending institutions, business firms, and all other users for financial information are indebted to Luca Pacioli for his monumental role in the development of accounting."

The ICAEW Library's rare book collection at Chartered Accountants' Hall holds the complete published works of Luca Pacioli. Sections of two of Pacioli's books, 'Summa de arithmetica' and 'Divina proportione' can be viewed online using Turning the Pages, an interactive tool developed by the British Library.

== Chess ==
Around 1500, Pacioli wrote an unpublished treatise on chess, De ludo scachorum (On the Game of Chess). Long thought to have been lost, a surviving manuscript was rediscovered in 2006, in the 22,000-volume library of Count Guglielmo Coronini-Cronberg in Gorizia. A facsimile edition of the book was published in Pacioli's home town of Sansepolcro in 2008. Based on Leonardo da Vinci's long association with the author and his having illustrated Divina proportione, some scholars speculate that Leonardo either drew the chess problems that appear in the manuscript or at least designed the chess pieces used in the problems.

== See also ==
- List of Roman Catholic scientist-clerics
- Della mercatura e del mercante perfetto
