= Divina proportione =

Book on proportions by Luca Pacioli, illustrated by Leonardo da Vinci

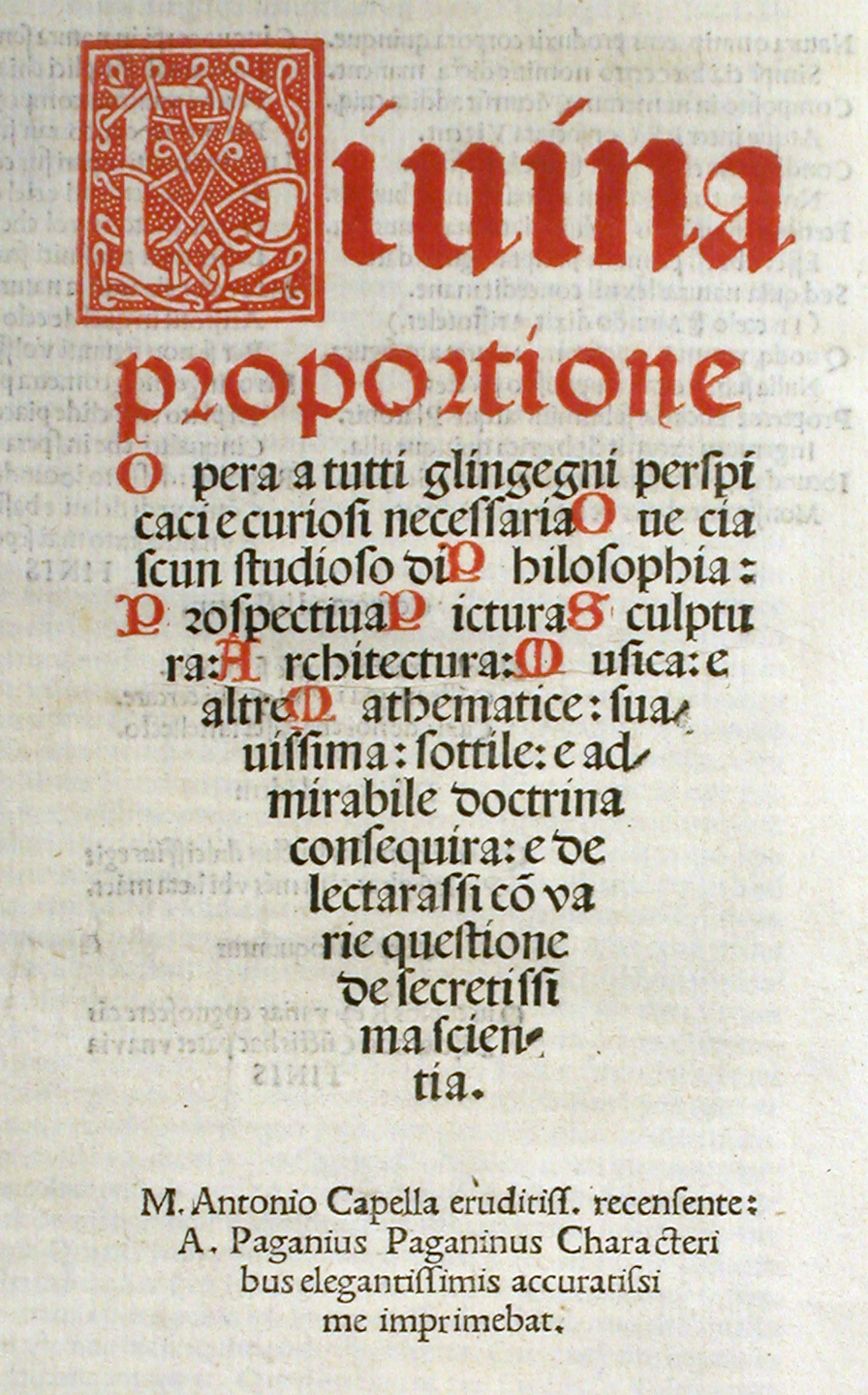
- Title page of 1509 edition
- Author: Luca Pacioli
- Illustrator: Leonardo da Vinci
- Language: Italian
- Subject: Geometry, Architecture
- Publisher: Paganini (Venice)
- Publication date: 1509
- Publication place: Republic of Venice

Divina proportione (15th century Italian for Divine proportion), later also called De divina proportione (converting the Italian title into a Latin one) is a book on mathematics written by Luca Pacioli and illustrated by Leonardo da Vinci, completed by February 9th, 1498 in Milan and first printed in 1509. Its subject was mathematical proportions (the title refers to the golden ratio) and their applications to geometry, to visual art through perspective, and to architecture. The clarity of the written material and Leonardo's excellent diagrams helped the book to achieve an impact beyond mathematical circles, popularizing contemporary geometric concepts and images.

Some of its content was plagiarised from an earlier book by Piero della Francesca, De quinque corporibus regularibus.

== Contents of the book ==
The book consists of three separate manuscripts, which Pacioli worked on between 1496 and 1498. He credits Fibonacci as the main source for the mathematics he presents.

=== Compendio divina proportione ===
The first part, Compendio divina proportione (Compendium on the Divine Proportion), studies the golden ratio from a mathematical perspective (following the relevant work of Euclid), giving mystical and religious meanings to this ratio, in seventy-one chapters. Pacioli points out that golden rectangles can be inscribed by an icosahedron, and in the fifth chapter, gives five reasons why the golden ratio should be referred to as the "Divine Proportion":

1. Its value represents divine simplicity.
2. Its definition invokes three lengths, symbolizing the Holy Trinity.
3. Its irrationality represents God's incomprehensibility.
4. Its self-similarity recalls God's omnipresence and invariability.
5. Its relation to the dodecahedron, which represents the quintessence

It also contains a discourse on the regular and semiregular polyhedra, as well as a discussion of the use of geometric perspective by painters such as Piero della Francesca, Melozzo da Forlì and Marco Palmezzano.

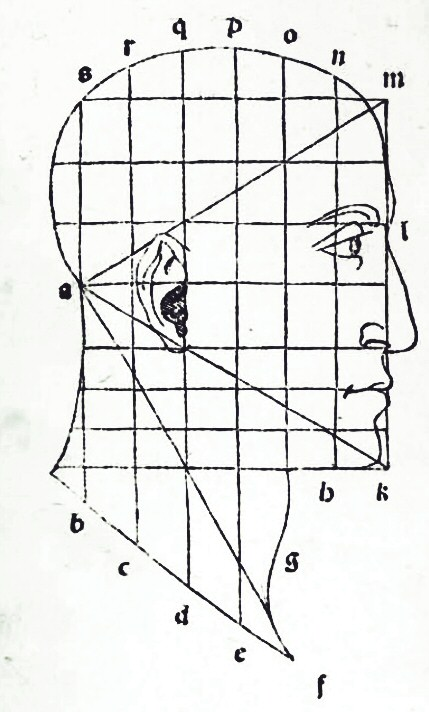
Woodcut illustrating proportions of the human face

=== Trattato dell'architettura ===
The second part, Trattato dell'architettura (Treatise on Architecture), discusses the ideas of Vitruvius (from his De architectura) on the application of mathematics to architecture in twenty chapters. The text compares the proportions of the human body to those of artificial structures, with examples from classical Greco-Roman architecture.

=== Libellus in tres partiales divisus ===
The third part, Libellus in tres partiales divisus (Book divided into three parts), is a translation into Italian of Piero della Francesca's Latin book De quinque corporibus regularibus [On [the] Five Regular Solids]. It does not credit della Francesca for this material, and in 1550 Giorgio Vasari wrote a biography of della Francesca, in which he accused Pacioli of plagiarism and claimed that he stole della Francesca's work on perspective, on arithmetic and on geometry. Because della Francesca's book had been lost, these accusations remained unsubstantiated until the 19th century, when a copy of della Francesca's book was found in the Vatican Library and a comparison confirmed that Pacioli had copied it.

=== Illustrations ===
After these three parts are appended two sections of illustrations, the first showing twenty-three capital letters drawn with a ruler and compass by Pacioli and the second with some sixty illustrations in woodcut after drawings by Leonardo da Vinci. Leonardo drew the illustrations of the regular solids while he lived with and took mathematics lessons from Pacioli. Leonardo's drawings are probably the first illustrations of skeletonic solids which allowed an easy distinction between front and back.

Another collaboration between Pacioli and Leonardo existed: Pacioli planned a book of mathematics and proverbs called De Viribus Quantitatis (The powers of numbers) which Leonardo was to illustrate, but Pacioli died before he could publish it.

== History ==
Pacioli produced three manuscripts of the treatise by different scribes. He gave the first copy with a dedication to the Duke of Milan, Ludovico il Moro; this manuscript is now preserved in Switzerland at the Bibliothèque de Genève in Geneva. A second copy was donated to Galeazzo da Sanseverino and now rests at the Biblioteca Ambrosiana in Milan. On 1 June 1509 the first printed edition was published in Venice by Paganino Paganini; it has since been reprinted several times.

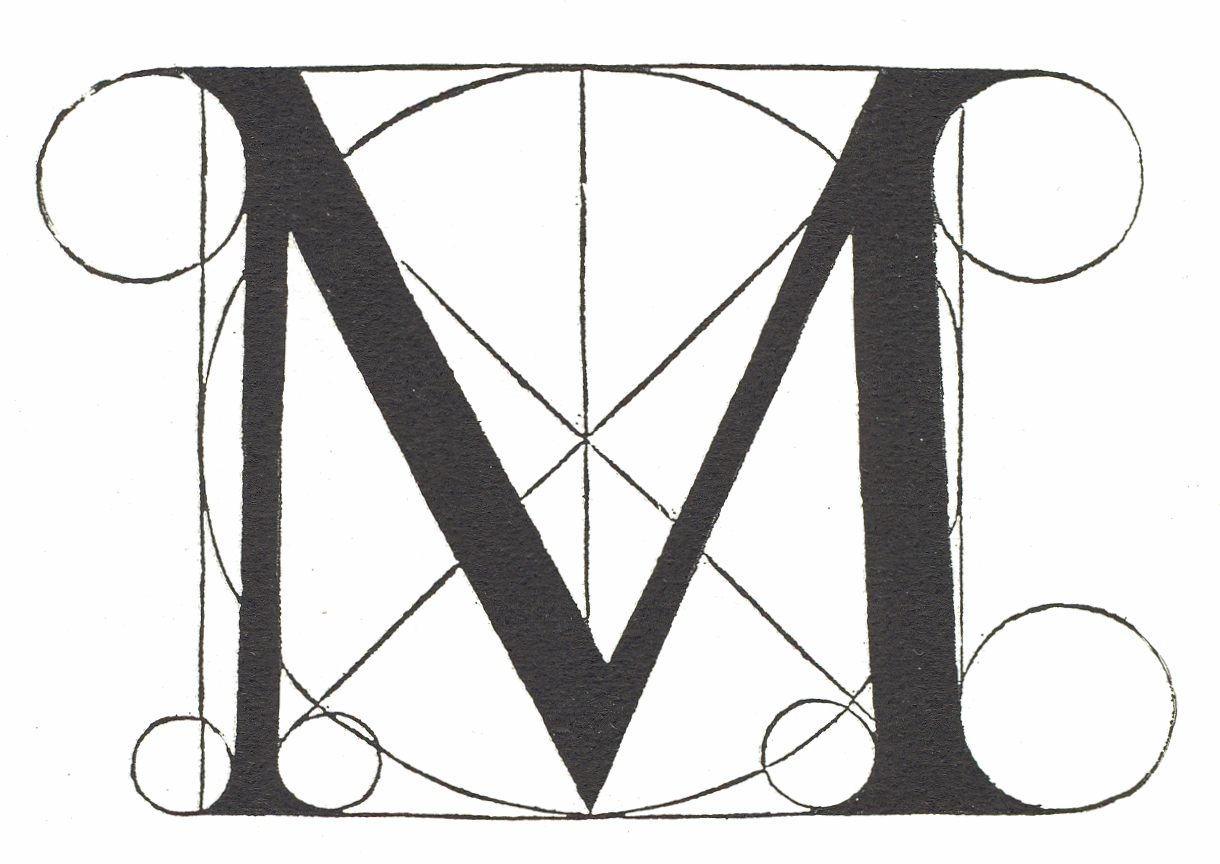
Architectural letter 'M'

The book was displayed as part of an exhibition in Milan between October 2005 and October 2006 together with the Codex Atlanticus. The "M" logo used by the Metropolitan Museum of Art in New York was adapted from one in Divina proportione.

== See also ==
- List of works by Leonardo da Vinci
- Frederik Macody Lund
- Samuel Colman
