= List of works designed with the golden ratio =

Many works of art are claimed to have been designed using the golden ratio. However, many of these claims are disputed, or refuted by measurement.

The golden ratio, an irrational number, is approximately 1.618; it is often denoted by the Greek letter φ (phi).

== Early history ==
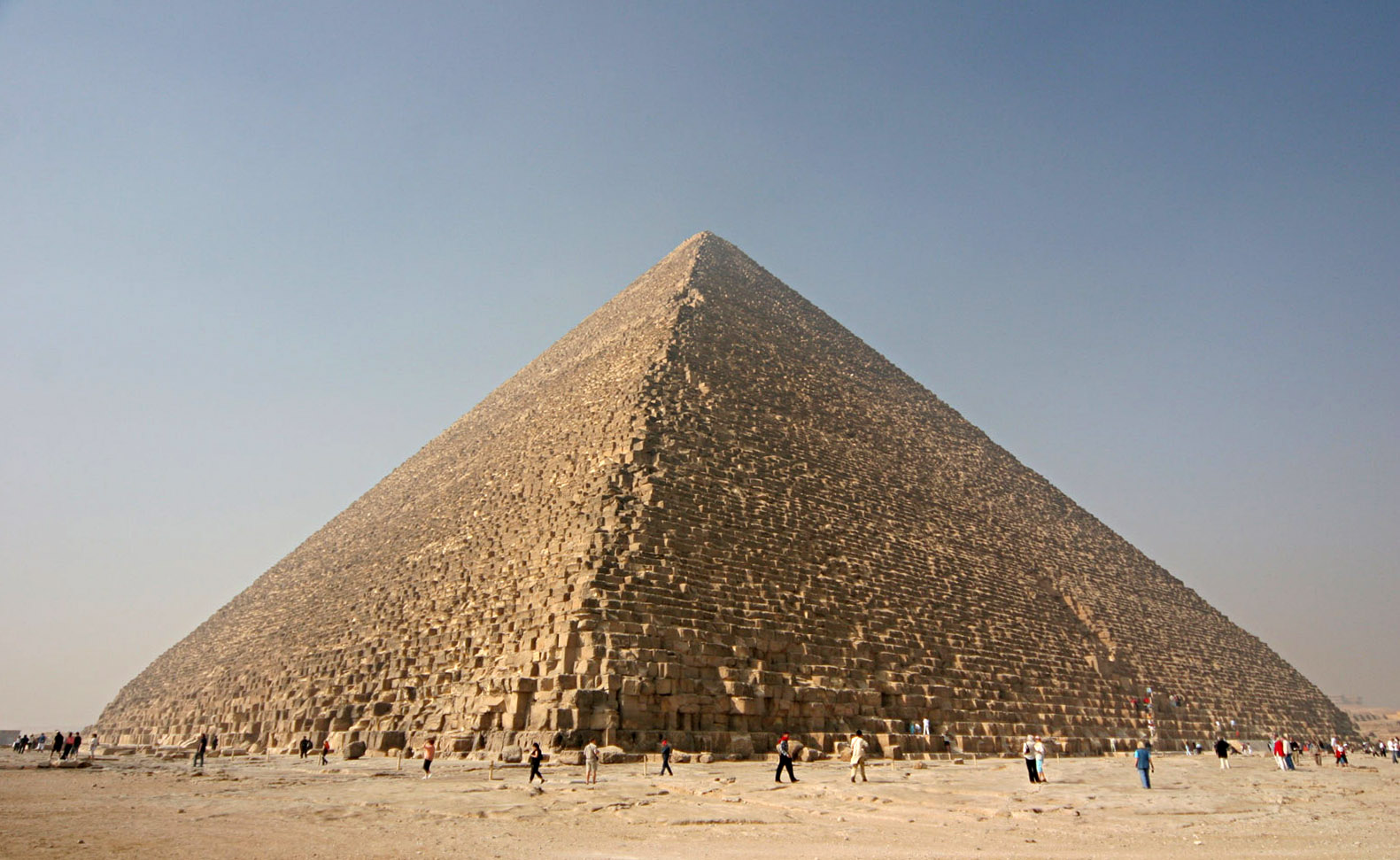
The Great Pyramid of Giza, Egypt

Various authors have claimed that early monuments have golden ratio proportions, often on conjectural interpretations, using approximate measurements, and only roughly corresponding to 1.618. For example, claims have been made about golden ratio proportions in Egyptian, Sumerian and Greek vases, Chinese pottery, Olmec sculptures, and Cretan and Mycenaean products from the late Bronze Age. These predate by some 1,000 years the Greek mathematicians first known to have studied the golden ratio. However, the historical sources are obscure, and the analyses are difficult to compare because they employ differing methods.

It is claimed, for instance, that Stonehenge (3100 BC – 2200 BC) has golden ratio proportions between its concentric circles. Kimberly Elam proposes this relation as early evidence of human cognitive preference for the golden ratio. However, others point out that this interpretation of Stonehenge "may be doubtful" and that the geometric construction that generates it can only be surmised. As another example, Carlos Chanfón Olmos states that the sculpture of King Gudea (c. 2350 BC) has golden proportions between all of its secondary elements repeated many times at its base.

The Great Pyramid of Giza (constructed c. 2570 BC by Hemiunu) exhibits the golden ratio according to various pyramidologists, including Charles Funck-Hellet. John F. Pile, interior design professor and historian, has claimed that Egyptian architects sought the golden proportions without mathematical techniques and that it is common to see the 1.618:1 ratio, along with many other simpler geometrical concepts, in their architectural details, art, and everyday objects found in tombs. In his opinion, "That the Egyptians knew of it and used it seems certain."

From before the beginning of these theories, other historians and mathematicians have proposed alternative theories for the pyramid designs that are not related to any use of the golden ratio, and are instead based on purely rational slopes that only approximate the golden ratio. The Egyptians of those times apparently did not know the Pythagorean theorem; the only right triangle whose proportions they knew was the 3:4:5 triangle.

== Ancient and medieval architecture ==
=== Greece ===
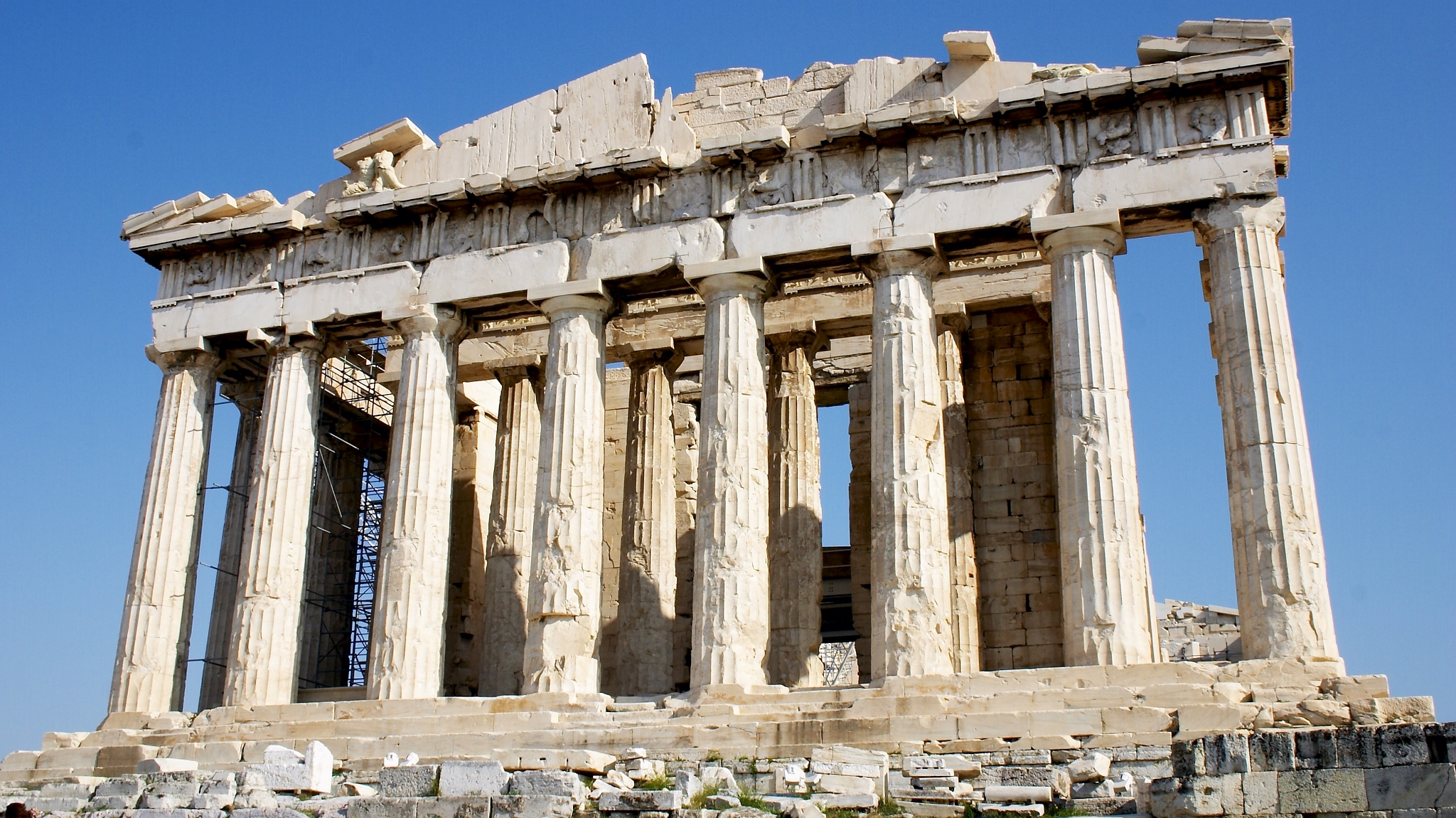
The Parthenon west façade

The Acropolis of Athens (468–430 BC), including the Parthenon, according to some studies, has many proportions that approximate the golden ratio. Other scholars question whether the golden ratio was known to or used by Greek artists and architects as a principle of aesthetic proportion. Building the Acropolis is calculated to have been started around 600 BC, but the works said to exhibit the golden ratio proportions were created from 468 BC to 430 BC.

The Parthenon (447–432 BC), was a temple of the Greek goddess Athena. The Parthenon's facade as well as elements of its facade and elsewhere are claimed to be circumscribed by a progression of golden rectangles. Some more recent studies dispute the view that the golden ratio was employed in the design.

Hemenway claims that the Greek sculptor Phidias (c. 480–c. 430 BC) used the divine proportion in some of his sculptures. He created Athena Parthenos in Athens and Statue of Zeus (one of the Seven Wonders of the Ancient World) in the Temple of Zeus at Olympia. He is believed to have been in charge of other Parthenon sculptures, although they may have been executed by his disciple or peers. In the early 20th century, American mathematician Mark Barr proposed the Greek letter phi (φ), the first letter of Phidias's name, to denote the golden ratio.

Lothar Haselberger claims that the Temple of Apollo in Didyma (c. 334 BC), designed by Daphnis of Mileto and Paionios of Ephesus, has golden proportions.

It is claimed that the upper level of 21 rows and the lower level of 34 rows of the Ancient Theatre of Epidaurus form an approximation of the Golden number since 21 and 34 are successive Fibonacci numbers with their ratio at $34/21 \approx 1.619$ and a careful examination of the theatre's center reveals two back-to-back triangles balanced by the Golden number.

=== Prehispanic Mesoamerican architecture ===
Between 1950 and 1960, Manuel Amabilis applied some of the analysis methods of Frederik Macody Lund and Jay Hambidge in several designs of prehispanic buildings, such as El Toloc and La Iglesia de Las Monjas (the Nuns Church), a notable complex of Terminal Classic buildings constructed in the Puuc architectural style at Chichen Itza. According to his studies, their proportions are concretized from a series of polygons, circles and pentagrams inscribed, as Lund found in his studies of Gothic churches. Manuel Amabilis published his studies along with several self-explanatory images of other pre-columbian buildings made with golden ratio proportions in La Arquitectura Precolombina de Mexico. The work was awarded the gold medal and the title of Academico by the Real Academia de Bellas Artes de San Fernando (Spain) in the Fiesta de la Raza (Columbus Day) of 1929.

The Castle of Chichen Itza was built by the Maya civilization between the 11th and 13th centuries AD as a temple to the god Kukulcan. John Pile claims that its interior layout has golden ratio proportions. He says that the interior walls are placed so that the outer spaces are related to the central chamber by the golden ratio.

=== Islamic architecture ===
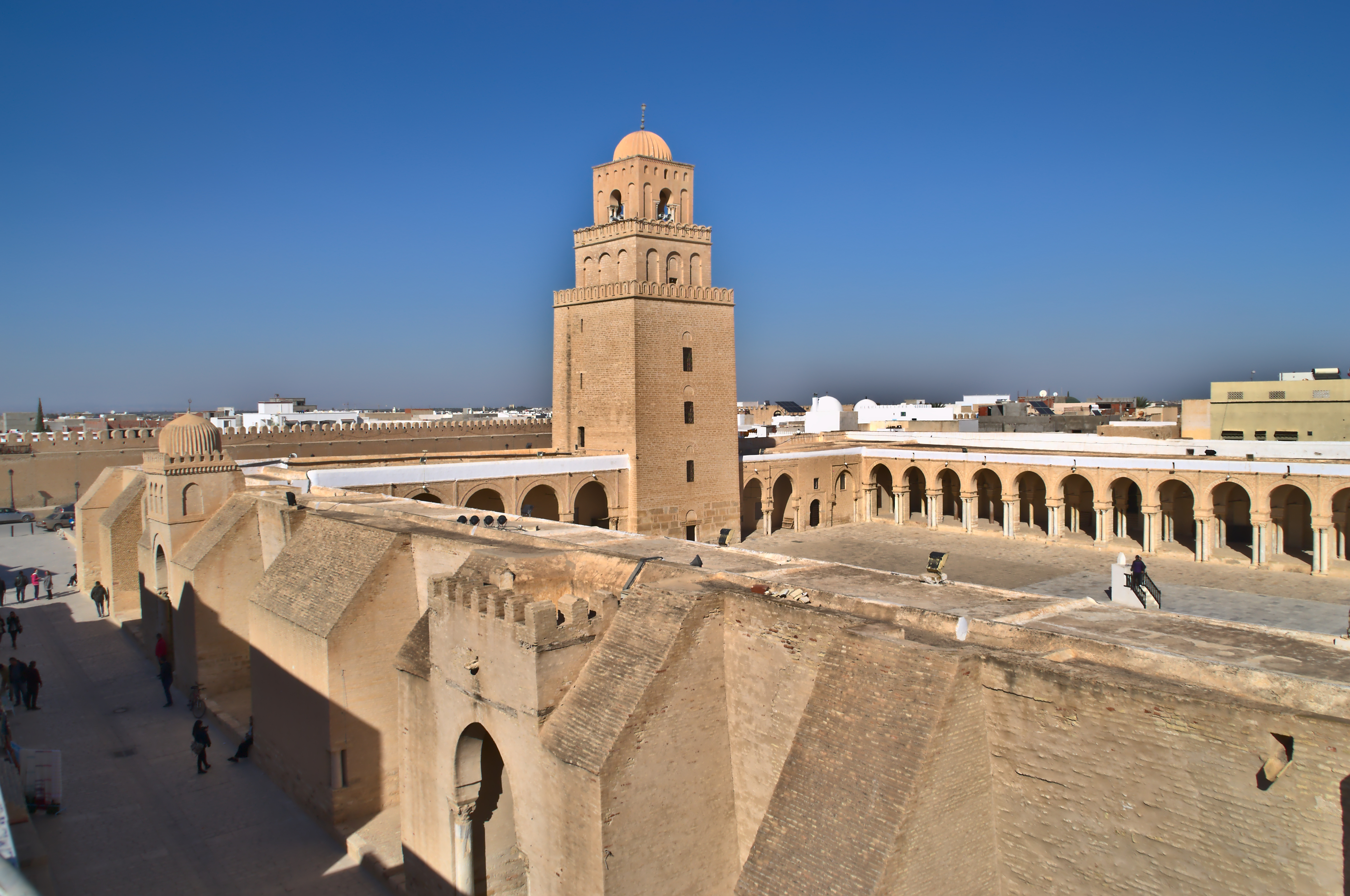
The Great Mosque of Kairouan, Tunisia

The Great Mosque of Kairouan (built by Uqba ibn Nafi c. 670 C.E.) uses the golden ratio in the design including its plan, the prayer space, court, and minaret, but the ratio does not appear in the original parts of the mosque.

=== Buddhist architecture ===
The Stupa of Borobudur in Java, Indonesia (built eighth to ninth century AD), the largest known Buddhist stupa, has the dimension of the square base related to the diameter of the largest circular terrace as 1.618:1, according to Pile.

=== Romanesque architecture ===
The Romanesque style of architecture prevailed in Europe between 900 and 1200, a period which ends with the transition to Gothic architecture. The contrast between Romanesque and Gothic concepts in religious buildings can be understood in the epistolary between St. Bernard, Cistercian, and the Abbot Suger of the order of Cluny, the initiator of Gothic art in St. Denis.

One of the most beautiful works of Romanesque Cistercian is the Sénanque Abbey in Provence. The Sénanque abbatial was founded in 1148 and consecrated in 1178. It was initiated in life of St Bernard of Clairvaux. "La Lumière à Sénanque" (The Light in Sénanque), a chapter of Cîteaux : commentarii cistercienses, a publication of the Cistercian Order. Its author, Kim Lloveras i Montserrat, made in 1992 a complete study of the abbatial, and argues that the abbatial church was designed using a system of measures founded in the golden ratio, and that the instruments used for its construction were the "Vescica" and the medieval squares used by the constructors, both designed with the golden ratio. The "Vescica" of Sénanque is located in the cloister of the monastery, in front of the Chapter, the site of the workshop.

=== Gothic architecture ===
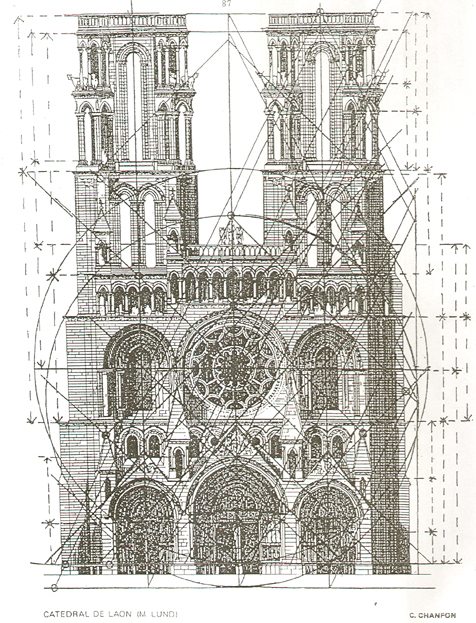
Illustration of Notre-Dame of Laon cathedral. According to Frederik Macody Lund, the superimposed regulator lines show that the cathedral has golden proportions.

In his 1919 book Ad Quadratum, Frederik Macody Lund, a historian who studied the geometry of several Gothic structures, claims that the Cathedral of Chartres (begun in the 12th century), the Notre-Dame of Laon (1157–1205), and the Notre-Dame de Paris (1160) are designed according to the golden ratio. Other scholars argue that until Luca Pacioli's 1509 De Divina Proportione (see next section), the golden ratio was unknown to artists and architects, although this is not likely the case since the ratio was explicitly defined by Euclid.

A 2003 conference on medieval architecture resulted in the book Ad Quadratum: The Application of Geometry to Medieval Architecture. According to a summary by one reviewer:

Most of the contributors consider that the setting out was done ad quadratum, using the sides of a square and its diagonal. This gave an incommensurate ratio of [square root of (2)] by striking a circular arc (which could easily be done with a rope rotating around a peg). Most also argued that setting out was done geometrically rather than arithmetically (with a measuring rod). Some considered that setting out also involved the use of equilateral or Pythagorean triangles, pentagons, and octagons. Two authors believe the Golden Section (or at least its approximation) was used, but its use in medieval times is not supported by most architectural historians.

The Australian architectural historian John James made a detailed study of the Cathedral of Chartres. In his work The Master Masons of Chartres he says that Bronze, one of the master masons, used the golden ratio. It was the same relation as between the arms of their metal square:

Bronze by comparison was an innovator, in practical rather than in philosophic things. Amongst other things Bronze was one of the few masters to use the fascinating ratio of the golden mean. For the builder, the most important function Fi, as we write the golden mean, is that if the uses is consistently he will find that every subdivision, no matter how accidentally it may have been derived, will fit somewhere into the series. Is not too difficult a ratio to reproduce, and Bronze could have had the two arms of his metal square cut to represent it. All he would than have had to do was to place the square on the stone and, using the string draw between the corners, relate any two lengths by Phi. Nothing like making life easy.

== Art ==
=== Renaissance ===
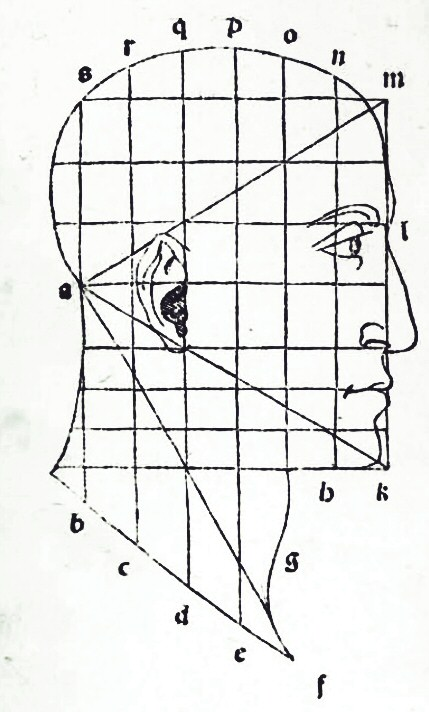
Leonardo da Vinci's illustration of a human head from Pacioli's De Divina Proportione

De divina proportione, written by Luca Pacioli in Milan in 1496–1498, published in Venice in 1509, features 60 drawings by Leonardo da Vinci, some of which illustrate the appearance of the golden ratio in geometric figures. Starting with part of the work of Leonardo da Vinci, this architectural treatise was a major influence on generations of artists and architects.

Vitruvian Man, created by Leonardo da Vinci around the year 1492, is based on the theories of the man after which the drawing takes its name, Vitruvius, who in De Architectura: The Planning of Temples (c. I BC) pointed that the planning of temples depends on symmetry, which must be based on the perfect proportions of the human body. Some authors feel there is no actual evidence that Da Vinci used the golden ratio in Vitruvian Man; however, Olmos (1991) observes otherwise through geometrical analysis. He also proposes Leonardo da Vinci's self portrait, Michelangelo's David (1501–1504), Albrecht Dürer's Melencolia I and the classic violin design by the masters of Cremona (Guarneri, Stradivari and several members of the Amati family) as having similar regulator lines related to the golden ratio.

Da Vinci's Mona Lisa (c. 1503–1506) "has been the subject of so many volumes of contradicting scholarly and popular speculations that it virtually impossible to reach any unambiguous conclusions" with respect to the golden ratio, according to Livio.

The Tempietto chapel at the Monastery of Saint Peter in Montorio, Rome, built by Bramante, has relations to the golden ratio in its elevation and interior lines.

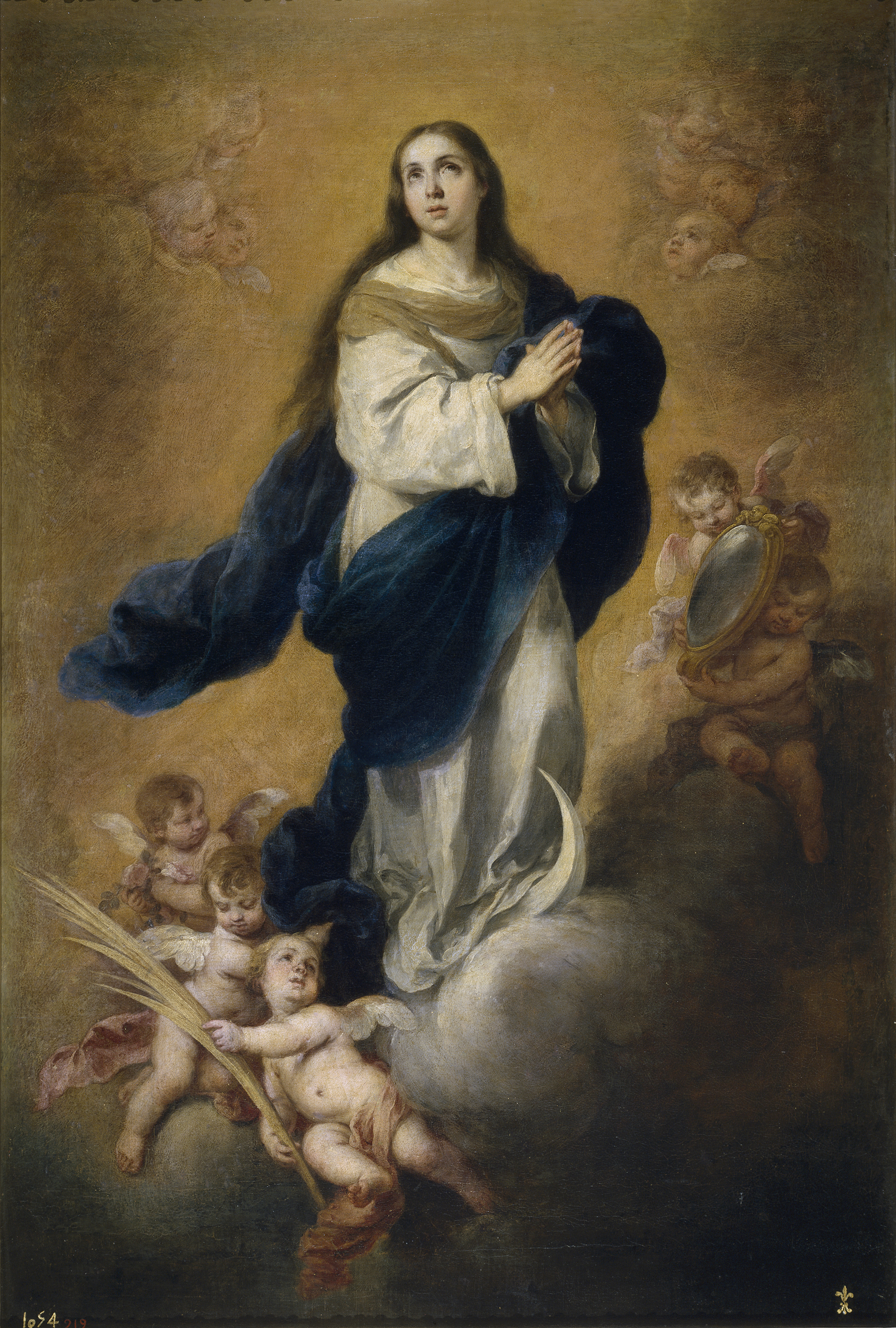
La Inmaculada Concepción (Murillo, 1665)

=== Baroque ===
José Villagrán García has claimed that the golden ratio is an important element in the design of the Mexico City Metropolitan Cathedral (circa 1667–1813). Olmos claims the same for the design of the cities of Coatepec (1579), Chicoaloapa (1579) and Huejutla (1580), as well as the Mérida Cathedral, the Acolman Temple, Christ Crucified by Diego Velázquez (1639) and The Immaculate Conception by Bartolomé Esteban Murillo.

=== Neo-Impressionism ===
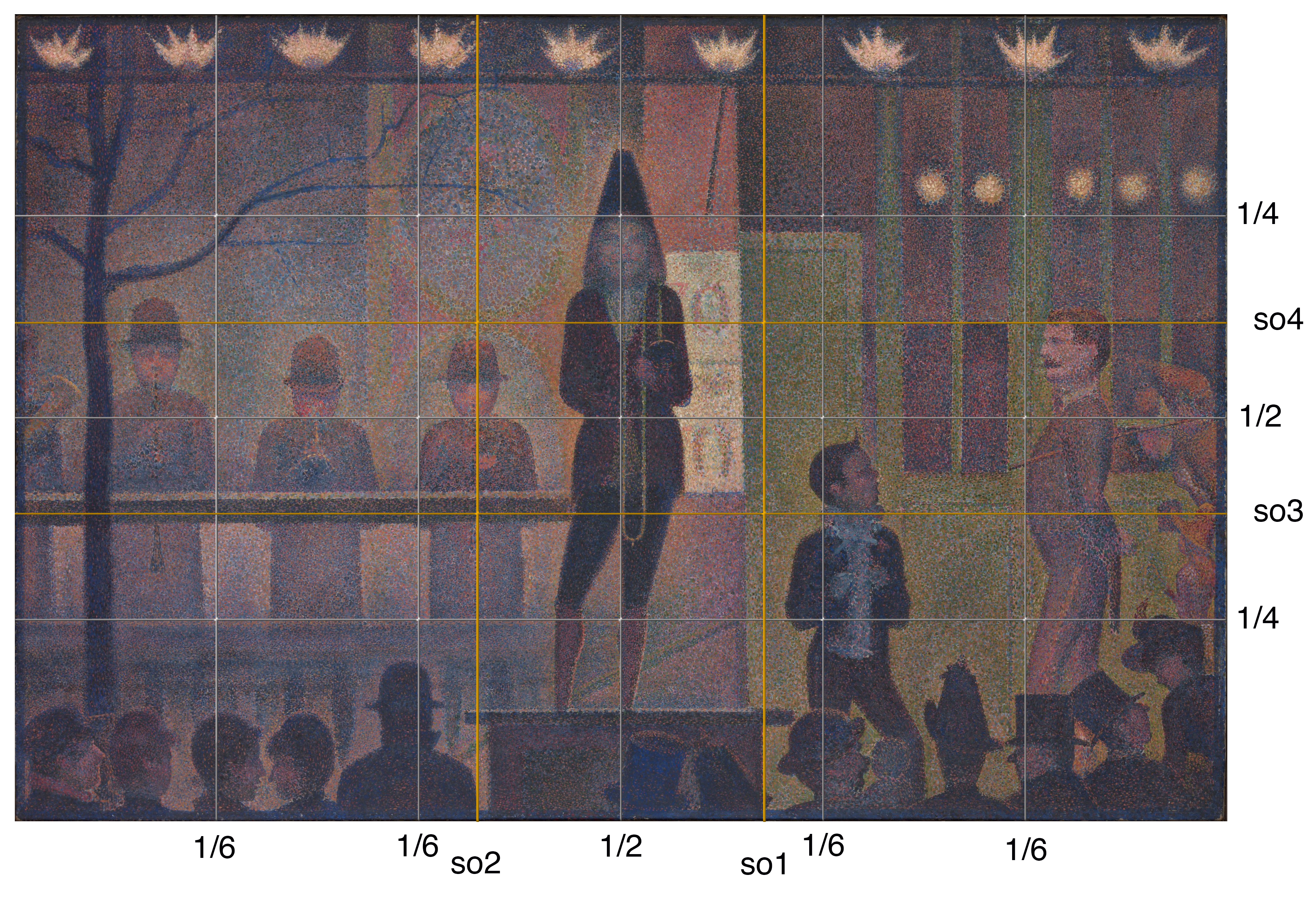
Georges Seurat, 1887-88, Parade de cirque (Circus Sideshow) with a 4 : 6 ratio division and golden mean overlay, showing only a close approximation to the divine proportion.

Matila Ghyka and others contend that Georges Seurat used golden ratio proportions in paintings like Parade de cirque, Le Pont de Courbevoie, and Bathers at Asnières. However, there is no direct evidence to support these claims.

While the golden ratio appears to govern the geometric structure of Seurat's Parade de cirque (Circus Sideshow), modern consensus among art historians is that Seurat never used this "divine proportion" in his work.

The final study of Parade, executed prior to the oil on canvas, is divided horizontally into fourths and vertically into sixths (4 : 6 ratio) corresponding to the dimensions of the canvas, which is one and one-half times wider than its vertical dimension. These axes do not correspond precisely to the golden section, 1 : 1.6, as might have been expected. Rather, they correspond to basic mathematical divisions (simple ratios that appear to approximate the golden section), as noted by Seurat with citations from the mathematician, inventor, esthetician Charles Henry.

=== Cubism ===
The idea of the Section d'Or (or Groupe de Puteaux) originated in the course of conversations between Albert Gleizes, Jean Metzinger and Jacques Villon. The group's title was suggested by Villon, after reading a 1910 translation of Leonardo da Vinci's A Treatise on Painting by Joséphin Péladan. Péladan attached great mystical significance to the golden section (French: nombre d'or), and other similar geometric configurations. For Villon, this symbolized his belief in order and the significance of mathematical proportions, because it reflected patterns and relationships occurring in nature. Jean Metzinger and the Duchamp brothers were passionately interested in mathematics. Jean Metzinger, Juan Gris and possibly Marcel Duchamp at this time were associates of Maurice Princet, an amateur mathematician credited for introducing profound and rational scientific arguments into Cubist discussions. The name 'Section d'Or' represented simultaneously a continuity with past traditions and current trends in related fields, while leaving open future developments in the arts.

=== Surrealism ===
The Sacrament of the Last Supper (1955): The canvas of this surrealist masterpiece by Salvador Dalí is a golden rectangle. A huge dodecahedron, with edges in golden ratio to one another, is suspended above and behind Jesus and dominates the composition.

=== De Stijl ===
Some works in the Dutch artistic movement called De Stijl, or neoplasticism, exhibit golden ratio proportions. Piet Mondrian used the golden section extensively in his neoplasticist, geometrical paintings, created circa 1918–38. Mondrian sought proportion in his paintings by observation, knowledge and intuition, rather than geometrical or mathematical methods.

== Recent architecture ==
=== Mies van der Rohe ===
The Farnsworth House, designed by Ludwig Mies van der Rohe, has been described as "the proportions, within the glass walls, approach 1:2" and "with a width to length ratio of 1:1.75 (nearly the golden section)" and has been studied with his other works in relation to the golden ratio.

=== Le Corbusier ===
The Swiss architect Le Corbusier, famous for his contributions to the modern international style, centered his design philosophy on systems of harmony and proportion. Le Corbusier's faith in the mathematical order of the universe was closely bound to the golden ratio and the Fibonacci number, which he described as "rhythms apparent to the eye and clear in their relations with one another. And these rhythms are at the very root of human activities. They resound in man by an organic inevitability, the same fine inevitability which causes the tracing out of the Golden Section by children, old men, savages and the learned."

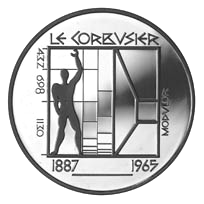
Commemorative Swiss coin showing the Modulor

Le Corbusier explicitly used the golden ratio in his system for the scale of architectural proportion. He saw this system as a continuation of the long tradition of Vitruvius, Leonardo da Vinci's Vitruvian Man, the work of Leon Battista Alberti, and others who used the proportions of the human body to improve the appearance and function of architecture. In addition to the golden ratio, Le Corbusier based the system on human measurements, Fibonacci numbers, and the double unit. He took Leonardo's suggestion of the golden ratio in human proportions to an extreme: he sectioned his model human body's height at the navel with the two sections in golden ratio, then subdivided those sections in golden ratio at the knees and throat; he used these golden ratio proportions in the Modulor system.

In The Modulor: A Harmonious Measure to the Human Scale, Universally Applicable to Architecture and Mechanics Le Corbusier reveals he used his system in the Marseilles Unité d'habitation (in the general plan and section, the front elevation, plan and section of the apartment, in the woodwork, the wall, the roof and some prefabricated furniture), a small office in 35 rue de Sèvres, a factory in Saint-Die and the United Nations Headquarters building in New York City. Many authors claim that the shape of the facade of the second is the result of three golden rectangles; however, each of the three rectangles that can actually be appreciated have different heights.

=== Josep Lluís Sert ===
Catalan architect Josep Lluis Sert, a disciple of Le Corbusier, applied the measures of the Modulor in all his particular works, including the Sert's House in Cambridge and the Joan Miró Foundation in Barcelona.

=== Neo-Gothic ===
According to the official tourism page of Buenos Aires, Argentina, the ground floor of the Palacio Barolo (1923), designed by Italian architect Mario Palanti, is built according to the golden ratio.

=== Post-modern ===
Another Swiss architect, Mario Botta, bases many of his designs on geometric figures. Several private houses he designed in Switzerland are composed of squares and circles, cubes and cylinders. In a house he designed in Origlio, the golden ratio is the proportion between the central section and the side sections of the house.

== Music ==
Ernő Lendvai analyzes Béla Bartók's works as being based on two opposing systems, that of the golden ratio and the acoustic scale, though other music scholars reject that analysis.

The musicologist Roy Howat has observed that the formal boundaries of Debussy's La mer correspond exactly to the golden section. Trezise finds the intrinsic evidence "remarkable", but cautions that no written or reported evidence suggests that Debussy consciously sought such proportions.

Leonid Sabaneyev hypothesizes that the separate time intervals of the musical pieces connected by the "culmination event", as a rule, are in the ratio of the golden section. However, the author attributes this incidence to the instinct of the musicians: "All such events are timed by author's instinct to such points of the whole length that they divide temporary durations into separate parts being in the ratio of the golden section."

Ron Knott exposes how the golden ratio is unintentionally present in several pieces of classical music:

- An article of American Scientist ("Did Mozart use the Golden mean?", March/April 1996), reports that John Putz found that there was considerable deviation from ratio section division in many of Mozart's sonatas and claimed that any proximity to this number can be explained by constraints of the sonata form itself.
- Derek Haylock claims that the opening motif of Ludwig van Beethoven's Symphony No. 5 in C minor, Op. 67 (c. 1804–08), occurs exactly at the golden mean point 0.618 in bar 372 of 601 and again at bar 228 which is the other golden section point (0.618034 from the end of the piece) but he has to use 601 bars to get these figures. This he does by ignoring the final 20 bars that occur after the final appearance of the motif and also ignoring bar 387.

According to author Leon Harkleroad, "Some of the most misguided attempts to link music and mathematics have involved Fibonacci numbers and the related golden ratio."

With few exceptions, numerators for the meter signatures (over 100) in Karlheinz Stockhausen's Klavierstück IX are either Fibonacci or Lucas numbers.

== Bibliography ==
- Pile, John (2005). A history of interior design. London: Laurence King. ISBN 978-1-85669-418-6.
