= Carlos Chanfon Olmos =

Mexican architect and professor

Carlos Chanfón Olmos (May 22, 1928 – February 27, 2002) was a Mexican architect and professor at the National Autonomous University of Mexico (UNAM), known for his research and publications of various topics in the field of architecture under the UNAM imprint. He received an honorary doctorate from the University of Colima in 2001.

He studied architecture at UNAM, where he eventually became a teacher and researcher. He published diverse works of international academic acknowledgement regarding themes such as the golden ratio, Villard de Honnecourt (the 13th-century artist from Picardy), and the history of architecture.

Among the works he published are Arquitectura del Siglo XVI: Temas Escogidos, Historia de la Arquitectura y Urbanismos Mexicanos, Wilars de Honecort, su Manuscrito, and Curso sobre Proporción, which was originally created as teaching material for an academic course he gave at the Autonomous University of Yucatán (Universidad Autónoma de Yucatán, UADY) along with Dr. Pablo Chico Ponce de León.

Curso sobre Proporciòn focuses on the diverse systems of proportions that have been used in architecture throughout history. He uses diverse graphic analysis done by other authors, such as Frederik Macody Lund, Jay Hambidge and José Villagrán García, but makes several of his own proposals.
