= Jay Hambidge =

American painter

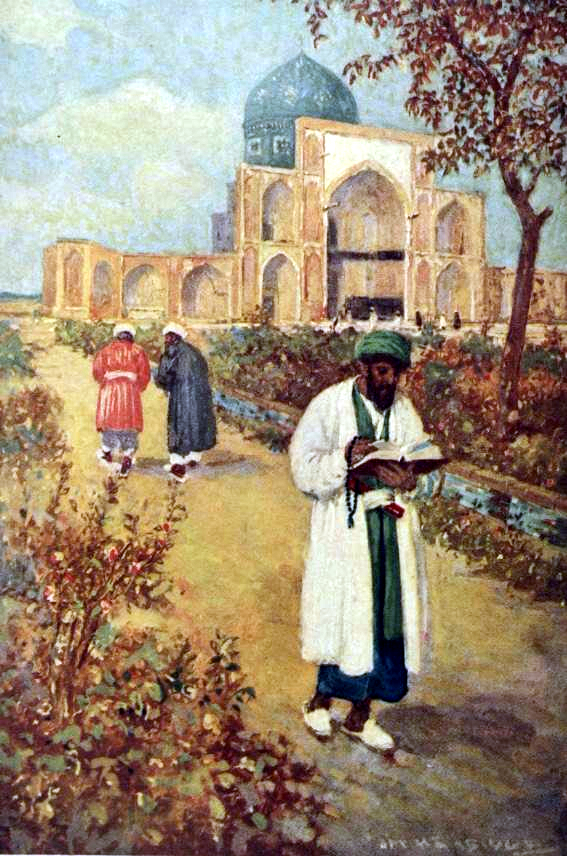
At the Tomb of Omar Khayyam, by Jay Hambidge

Jay Hambidge (1867–1924) was an American artist who formulated the theory of "dynamic symmetry", a system defining compositional rules, which was adopted by several notable American and Canadian artists in the early 20th century.

== Early life and theory ==
He was a pupil at the Art Students' League in New York and of William Merritt Chase, and a thorough student of classical art. He conceived the idea that the study of arithmetic with the aid of geometrical designs was the foundation of the proportion and symmetry in Greek architecture, sculpture and ceramics. Careful examination and measurements of classical buildings in Greece, among them the Parthenon, the temple of Apollo at Bassæ, of Zeus at Olympia and Athenæ at Ægina, prompted him to formulate the theory of "dynamic symmetry" as demonstrated in his works Dynamic Symmetry: The Greek Vase (1920) and The Elements of Dynamic Symmetry (1926). It created a great deal of discussion. He found a disciple in Dr. Lacey D. Caskey, the author of Geometry of Greek Vases (1922).

In 1921, articles critical of Hambidge's theories were published by Edwin M. Blake in Art Bulletin, and by Rhys Carpenter in American Journal of Archaeology. Art historian Michael Quick says Blake and Carpenter "used different methods to expose the basic fallacy of Hambidge's use of his system on Greek art—that in its more complicated constructions, the system could describe any shape at all." In 1979 Lee Malone said Hambidge's theories were discredited, but that they had appealed to many American artists in the early 20th century because "he was teaching precisely the things that certain artists wanted to hear, especially those who had blazed so brief a trail in observing the American scene and now found themselves displaced by the force of contemporary European trends."

He was married to the American weaver Mary Crovatt.

=== Dynamic symmetry ===
Dynamic symmetry is a proportioning system and natural design methodology described in Hambidge's books. The system uses dynamic rectangles, including root rectangles based on ratios such as √2, √3, √5, the golden ratio (φ = 1.618...), its square root (√φ = 1.272...), and its square (φ^{2} = 2.618....), and the silver ratio ($\delta_s=2.414...$).

From the study of phyllotaxis and the related Fibonacci sequence (1, 1, 2, 3, 5, 8, 13, 21, 34, 55, 89, 144, ...), Hambidge says that "a much closer representation would be obtained by a substitute series such as 118, 191, 309, 500, 809, 1309, 2118, 3427, 5545, 8972, 14517, etc. One term of this series divided into the other equals 1.6180, which is the ratio needed to explain the plant design system." This substitute sequence is a generalization of the Fibonacci sequence that chooses 118 and 191 as the beginning numbers to generate the rest. In fact, the standard Fibonacci sequence provides the best possible rational approximations to the golden ratio for numbers of a given size.

A number of notable American and Canadian artists have used dynamic symmetry in their painting, including George Bellows (1882–1925), Maxfield Parrish (1870–1966), The New Yorker cartoonist Helen Hokinson (1893–1949), Al Nestler (1900–1971), Kathleen Munn (1887–1974), the children's book illustrator and author Robert McCloskey (1914–2003), and Clay Wagstaff (b. 1964). Elizabeth Whiteley has used dynamic symmetry for works on paper.

== Applications ==
=== Photography ===
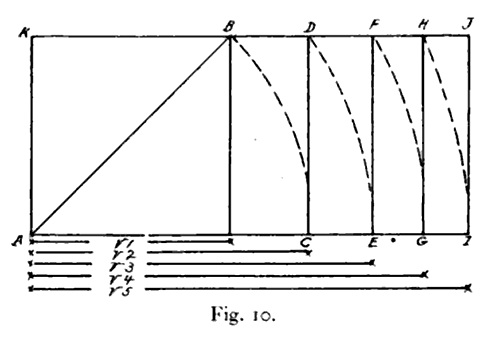
Root Rectangles to Generate diagonals for Dynamic Symmetry

The application and psychology of Dynamic Symmetry in such a fast and modern medium such as photography, in particular Digital Photography, is challenging but not impossible. The Rule of Thirds has been the composition of choice for a majority of new and experienced photographers alike. Although this method is effective, Dynamic Symmetry can be applied to compositions to create a level of in depth creativity and control over the image. According to Bob Holmes, a photographer from National Geographic, a photographer must "be responsible for everything in the frame". Using diagonals to align subjects and the reciprocal diagonals associated to the size of the frame, one would be able to create a highly intricate work of fine art. For example, the portrait photographer Annie Leibovitz used this method to create an image, among many others, for Vanity Fair Magazine. The image correctly posed each of the models to intersect the subject with a corresponding diagonal to draw the viewer to the main idea of the photograph.

This powerful process was used regularly by French painter turned film photographer: Henri Cartier-Bresson. Using Dynamic Symmetry, Henri was able to create engaging and interesting photographs that he deemed were made with the idea of "The Decisive Moment", a photographic psychology that describes "when the visual and psychological elements of people in a real life scene to spontaneously and briefly come together in perfect resonance to express the essence of that situation".

== See also ==
- Frederik Macody Lund
- List of works designed with the golden ratio
- On the Divine Proportion
- Samuel Colman
