= Mary Crovatt Hambidge =

American artist

- Born: Mary Crovatt; December 20, 1885
- Died: August 29, 1973 (aged 87)
- Occupation(s): Artist; weaver
- Spouse: Jay Hambidge
- Website: hambidge.org

Mary Crovatt Hambidge (1885-1973) was an American weaver. She is known for establishing the Hambidge Center for Creative Arts and Sciences in rural Georgia. The institution is still in existence as the Hambidge Center

== Biography ==
Hambidge was born in Brunswick, Georgia on December 20, 1885 Hambidge was educated in Cambridge, MA at the Lee School For Girls. She moved to New York, NY in the 1910s. There she met illustrator and art theorist Jay Hambidge.

In the early 1920s the couple visited Greece. There Hambidge learned about weaving. She continued weaving when she returned to New York. In 1924 after the death of her husband, she moved to Rabun County in the north Georgia mountains and began meeting spinners and weavers in the area. In 1934, she located her small weaving operations to an 800-acre property including buildings and pastures, which she was later able to purchase with the help of the philanthropist Eleanor Steele Reese. That property would become the Jay Hambidge Art Foundation in 1941.

Fabric produced at the Foundation were marketed under the name Weavers of Rabun. Hambidge maintained a retail location for the crafts in New York. In 1937 the Weavers of Rabun won a gold medal at the Exposition Internationale )the Paris World's Fair). Weavings were included in the 1956 exhibit at the Museum of Modern Art entitled Textiles U.S.A. (as the Jay Hambidge Art Foundation).

Demand for handwoven fabric declined in 1950s with the expanded industrialization of the textile industry. The Weavers of Rabun disbanded. Hambidge changed the focus of the Center towards a broader retreat for artists.

Hambidge died on August 29, 1973.
