= Elizabeth Whiteley =

American artist

- Occupations: Fine artist and designer
- Known for: Mathematical art
- Website: portfolio.elizabethwhiteley.com

Elizabeth Whiteley (born 1945) is an American fine artist and designer.

== Early life and education ==
Whiteley was born in Erie, Pennsylvania, US, in 1945. Whiteley earned a B.A. degree from Carnegie Mellon University (CMU), and a M.S. in library science from Case Western Reserve University (CWRU). She received a B.F.A. from the School of the Art Institute of Chicago (SAIC).

== Career ==
Whiteley concentrates on the connections between mathematics and art, with an emphasis on seeking geometric principles related to rectangles, triangles, and squares. They form the basis for her work with various genres in the visual arts. As part of a critic's residency essay, David Carrier wrote about her work "I understood better how her images were produced by seeing the grid she used to compose. This apparent way of restricting her composition actually gave her the freedom to choose where to set her patterns."

=== Paintings, drawings, and sculpture ===
Since 1988, she has used the geometric design elements of dynamic symmetry as presented by Jay Hambidge, for paintings, works on paper, and sculpture. She also uses the geometric construction of the sacred cut, named by a Danish engineer, Tons Brunes. She is also influenced by the research on the sacred cut done by Kim Williams and by Jay Kappraff. She applies the sacred cut line drawing as subject matter and a compositional structure for her ink drawings and metalpoint drawings.

She has been inspired by propositions in Euclid's Elements when creating sculpture and drawings.

An attraction to pattern design led to independent study of the techniques and writings of British designers such as Lewis Foreman Day. She used his techniques for disguising the generator to create contemporary patterns.

=== Artist's books ===
Whiteley has explored various printed and handmade processes for creating artist's books. She learned about artists' books as works of art utilizing the form of the book when she was a photography student of Keith A. Smith at the School of the Art Institute of Chicago. In 1989, she was the artist's book designer and co-illustrator for a shuffle book, Deck of Cards, by Peter H. Beaman. She oversaw the offset lithography production of the edition at Pyramid Atlantic Art Center, founded by Helen C. Frederick. Johanna Drucker included an analysis of the book in her textbook on artists' books.

Whiteley created Welcoming Beauty 1 in 2018. It is composed of hand painted folders containing elaborately folded papers based on the two-dimensional principles of dynamic symmetry transposed to three-dimensions. As the reader unfolds the papers, Whiteley's original writings about beauty as a spiritual theme are revealed. She expanded the content of Welcoming Beauty 1 and created a digital, or electronic, artist's book. Titled Welcoming Beauty 2, it contains her paintings and writings, as well as drawings based on the sacred cut. The e-book was published in 2019.

=== Metalpoint drawings ===
Whiteley uses silverpoint as a drawing medium. The technique was widely used during the Italian Renaissance. She became fascinated by drawing with metal while an art student at the School of the Art Institute of Chicago. Her anatomy teacher, Paula Gerard, was a master of the technique of using a sterling silver stylus on a prepared ground. Whiteley draws with silver or gold styluses to represent botanical themes, geometric forms, frieze groups, and the sacred cut. For an essay about her solo exhibition of silverpoint drawing over color washes at the McLean Center for the Arts, curator Nancy Sausser wrote "As an artist, Whiteley shows us her respect for the past, pays homage to it in these works, yet remains firmly rooted in the present as well." Her work with metalpoint drawing over inkjet printed images is discussed in a metalpoint textbook by Susan Schwalb and Tom Mazzullo.

== Professional activities ==
Along with Sheila Rotner and Zinnia, she was a founder and editor of EyeWash, a monthly tabloid of visual arts peer reviews for the Washington DC area. It was published from 1989 to 1993. In addition to editing, she contributed editorial page articles and reviews of exhibits. Issues and administrative records for EyeWash are available in the Archives of American Art.

Whiteley has published articles in professional journals and she has presented talks at conferences on mathematics and art, such as the annual international Joint Mathematics Meetings(JMM). She has presented papers on historical approaches to contemporary pattern design, using basic geometric shapes to create surface patterns, and frieze groups.

From 2006 to 2011, she served on the editorial board of the Journal of Mathematics and the Arts (JMA) and was a peer reviewer. From 2010 to 2011 she served as an associate editor and co-editor for book and exhibition reviews. From 2006 to 2011, she served as an associate editor of Hyperseeing, the journal of the International Society of Art, Mathematics, and Architecture (ISAMA).

== Exhibitions ==
She has shown her artworks in juried and invitational fine art exhibits from regional to international levels. In 1979, she won a museum purchase award from the Carnegie Museum of Art at the 70th Annual Exhibit of the Associated Artists of Pittsburgh. In 1985, she had a solo exhibition of paintings and hand colored monoprints at the Pittsburgh Center for the Arts as a member of the Associated Artists of Pittsburgh.

The Bridges Organization has included Whiteley's mathematical art in juried exhibitions at their international conferences. Her sculptures based on the dynamic symmetry of the square root of two were exhibited in 2006 and bas-relief sculptures with flexible planar surfaces were exhibited in 2012.

== Selected collections ==
Whiteley's works on paper and metalpoint drawings are in museum collections such as the Carnegie Museum of Art, the Erie Art Museum, and the Spencer Museum of Art.

Her artists' books are located in non-circulating special collections within the libraries of numerous museums. For her handmade artists' books, they include: the Art Gallery of Ontario; the Ryerson & Burnham Libraries of the Art Institute of Chicago (AIC); the Brooklyn Museum Libraries and Archives of the Brooklyn Museum of Art; the Clark Art Institute; the Museum of Fine Arts, Boston; the National Gallery of Art, Washington, DC; the National Museum of Women in the Arts; and the Whitney Museum of American Art. For her artist's books created with an offset lithography process, the special collections include: the Thomas J. Watson Library of the Metropolitan Museum of Art; the Museum of Modern Art (MoMA); and the National Art Library of the Victoria and Albert Museum (V&A).

Art schools that have collected her artists' books for the study and research purposes of their students include the Maryland Institute College of Art (MICA), the Rhode Island School of Design (RISD), and the Savannah College of Art and Design (SCAD).

== Selected publications ==
- Whiteley, E. "Visually Transforming Square Root Rectangles," Symmetry: Culture and Science. vol. 6, no. 3, pp. 535–538 (1995).
- Whiteley, E. "Visual Transformation of Square Root Rectangles," Symmetry: Culture and Science. vol. 6, no. 4, pp. 639–640 (1995).
- Whiteley, E. "Hyperseeing on a Two-Dimensional Plane," Hyperseeing, the Journal of the International Society of Art, Mathematics, and Architecture, September 2007.
- Whiteley, E. "A Process for Generating 2D Paintings and Drawings from Geometric Diagrams," Journal of Mathematics and the Arts, Vol. 2, No. 1, March 2008.
- Whiteley, E. "Curved Plane Sculpture: Triangles," Hyperseeing Special Issue on ISAMA(International Society of Art, Mathematics, and Architecture) 2010. Proceedings. Ergun Akleman and Nathaniel Friedman, editors.
- Whiteley, E. Welcoming Beauty 2, Spring Light Books, 2019. Apple Books app, Cupertino CA.
- Whiteley, E. A Loose Leaf Sketchbook. Sketchbook Project, Volume 15. Brooklyn Art Library. Brooklyn, New York, 2019.
- Whiteley, E. "Contemporary Art Inspired by Geometry," Journal of Mathematics and the Arts, v. 14:1-2, pp. 164–166. March–June 2020.
