= Modulor =

Le Corbusier's anthropometric scale of proportions

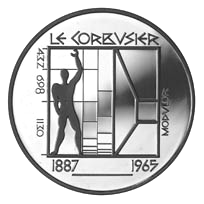
Commemorative Swiss coin showing the modulor.

The Modulor is an anthropometric scale of proportions devised by the Swiss-born French architect Le Corbusier (1887–1965).

It was developed as a visual bridge between two incompatible scales, the Imperial and the metric systems. It is based on the height of a man with his arm raised. The Modulor deemed the standard human height to be 1.83 m (6 ft 0 in), excluding feminine measures. The dimensions were refined with overall height of raised arm set at 2.26 m (7 ft 5 in).

It was used as a system to set out a number of Le Corbusier's buildings and was later codified into two books.

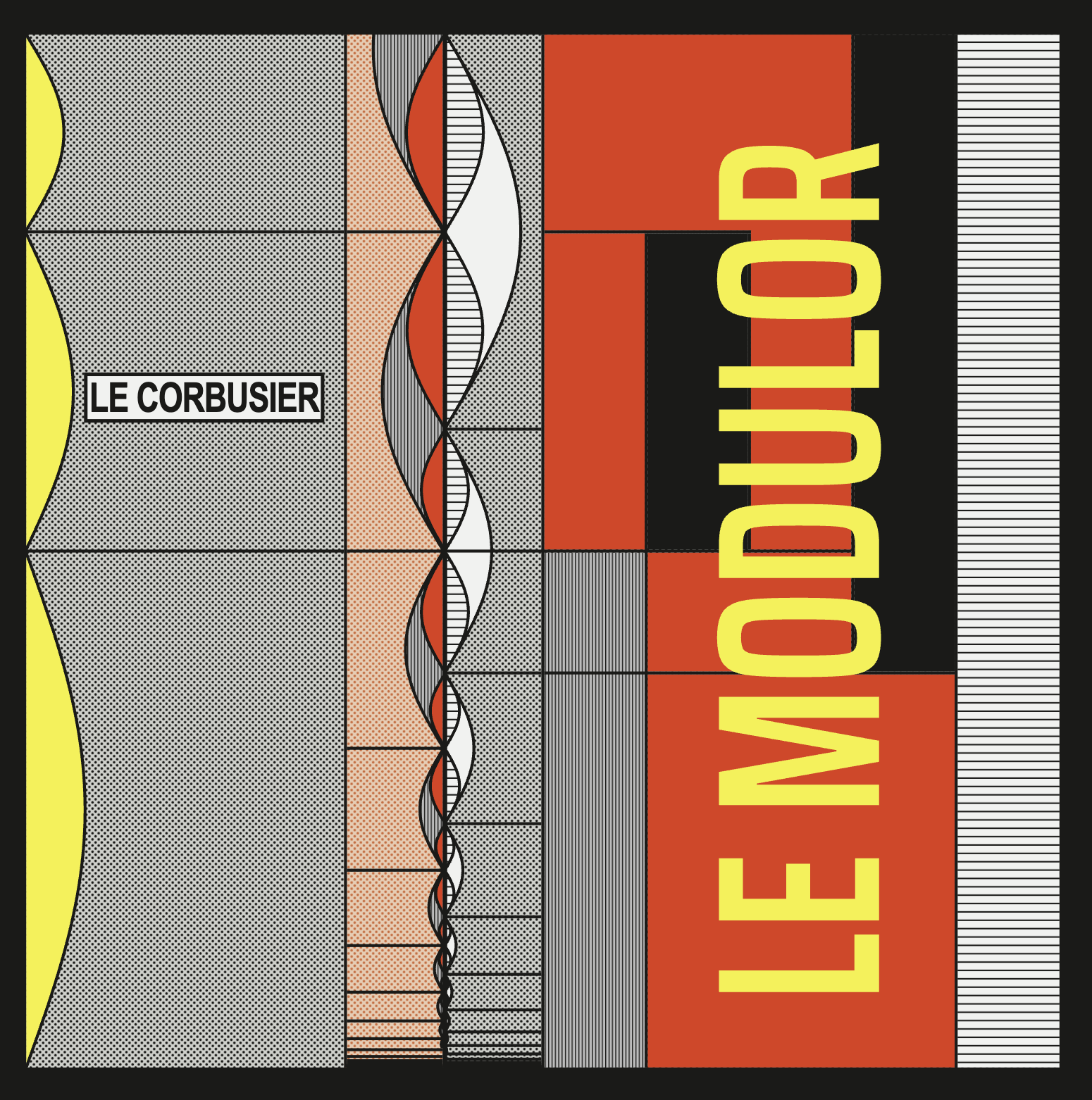
Modern recreation of the cover of Le Corbusier's book on the Modulor

== History ==
Le Corbusier developed the Modulor in the long tradition of Vitruvius, Leonardo da Vinci's Vitruvian Man, the work of Leon Battista Alberti, and other attempts to discover mathematical proportions in the human body and then to use that knowledge to improve both the appearance and function of architecture. The system is inspired by but does not exactly correspond to human measurements, and it also draws inspiration from the Fibonacci numbers and the golden ratio. Le Corbusier described it as a "range of harmonious measurements to suit the human scale, universally applicable to architecture and to mechanical things".

With the Modulor, Le Corbusier sought to introduce a scale of visual measures that would unite two virtually incompatible systems: the Anglo-Saxon foot and inch and the international metric system. Whilst he was intrigued by ancient civilisations who used measuring systems linked to the human body: elbow (cubit), finger (digit), thumb (inch) etc., he was troubled by the metre as a measure that was a forty-millionth part of the meridian of the earth.

In 1943, in response to the French National Organisation for Standardisation's (AFNOR) requirement for standardising all the objects involved in the construction process, Le Corbusier asked an apprentice to consider a scale based upon a man with his arm raised to 2.20 m in height. The result, in August 1943 was the first graphical representation of the derivation of the scale. This was refined after a visit to the Dean of the Faculty of Sciences in Sorbonne on 7 February 1945 which resulted in the inclusion of a golden section into the representation.

Whilst initially the Modulor Man's height was based on an average French man's height of 1.75 metres (5 ft 9 in) it was changed to 1.83 m in 1946 because "in English detective novels, the good-looking men, such as policemen, are always six feet tall!". The dimensions were refined to give round numbers and the overall height of the raised arm was set at 2.26 m (7 ft 5 in).

Of the works leading to the creation of the Modulor, Robin Evans notes that the female body "was only belatedly considered and rejected as a source of proportional harmony".

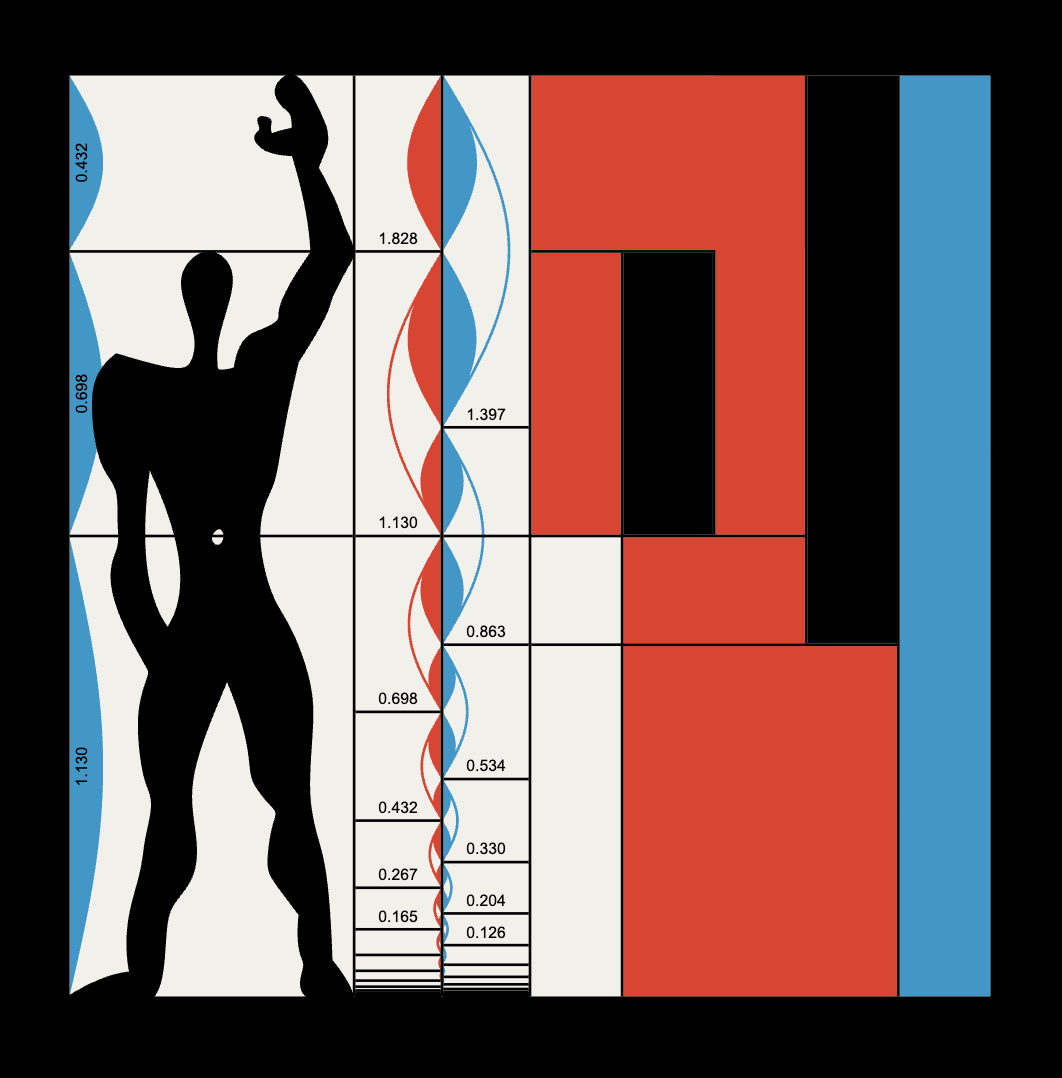
Le Corbusier's Modulor generated in Python. For full resolution see the file on Wikimedia Commons

== Promotion ==
On 10 January 1946 during a visit to New York, Le Corbusier met with Henry J. Kaiser, an American industrialist whose Kaiser Shipyard had built Liberty ships during World War II. Kaiser's project was to build ten thousand new houses a day, but he had changed his mind and decided to build cars instead. During the interview, Le Corbusier sympathised with Kaiser's problems of coordinating the adoption of equipment between the American and British armies because of the differences in units of length; and promoted his own harmonious scale.

On the same trip he met with David E. Lilienthal of the Tennessee Valley Authority to promote the use of his harmonious scale on further civil engineering projects.

He also applied the principle of the Modulor to the efficient design of distribution crates in post war France.

== Graphic representation ==
Modulor measurements of humans in various positions

The graphic representation of the Modulor, a stylised human figure with one arm raised, stands next to two vertical measurements, a red series based on the figure's navel height (1.08 m (3 ft 7 in) in the original version, (1.13 m (3 ft 8 in) in the revised version) and segmented according to the Golden ratio and a blue series based on the figure's entire height, double the navel height ((2.16 m (7 ft 1 in) in the original version, (2.26 m (7 ft 5 in) in the revised), segmented similarly. A spiral, graphically developed between the red and blue segments, seems to mimic the volume of the human figure.

The Modulor 2 was drawn by André Maissonier and Justino Serralta.

== Practical application ==
3D printed Le Corbusier Modulor found on Thingiverse

Le Corbusier used his Modulor scale in the design of many buildings, including:

=== Unité d'Habitation à Marseille ===
In his first book on the subject The Modulor, Le Corbusier has a chapter on the use of the modular in the Unité d'Habitation. The modular governs: the plan, section and elevations; the brise-soleil; the roof; the supporting columns and the plan and section of the apartments. It was also used for the dimensions of the commemorative stone laid on 14 October 1947. A version of the Modulor Man was cast in concrete near the entrance.

=== Church of Sainte Marie de La Tourette ===
In the Church of Sainte Marie de La Tourette Le Corbusier floors the majority of the church in pale concrete panels set to Modulor dimensions. Also, the engineer Iannis Xenakis applied the Modulor system to the design of the exterior vertical ventilators or "ondulatoires".

=== Carpenter Center for the Visual Arts ===
In the Carpenter Center the Modulor system was used for the brise-soleil distances, the floor to floor heights, the bay distances and the column thicknesses. Le Corbusier conceived that the dimensioning of the entrance ramp would be "visible essay on the mathematics of the human body".

=== Unite d'Habitation a Berlin. ===
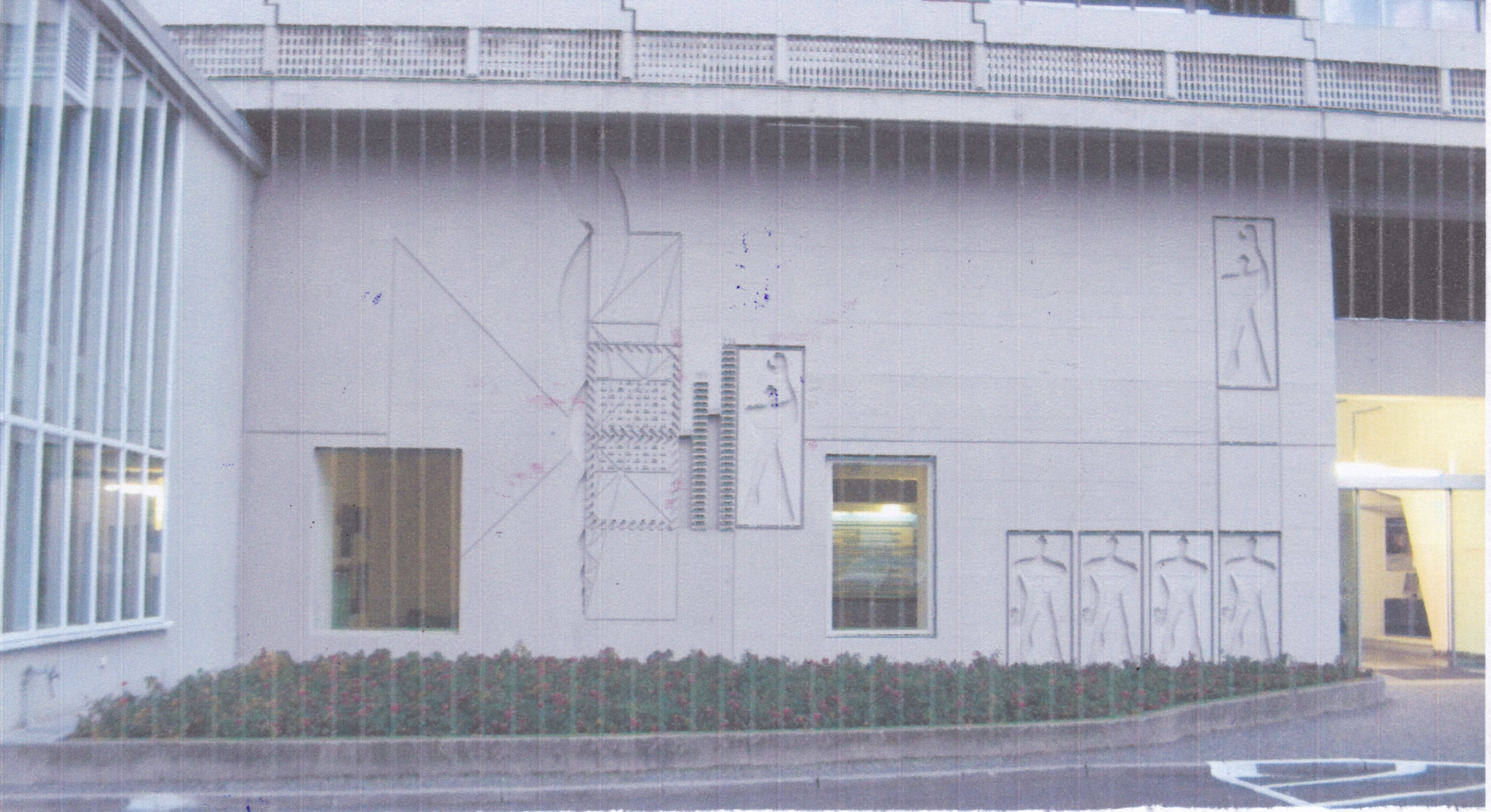
Modulor applied in Berlin

In this image of the Modulor in Berlin, there are several messages cast in the facade:

1. The typical apartment is designed for four people. (Note 4 people in bed on the right).
2. The patterns of paint on the side of the balconies is explained by diagonal line.
3. Brise Soleil is sized by the height of the Modulor man.
4. The room height is calculated by the Modulor.

== Publication ==
Le Corbusier published Le Modulor in 1948, followed by Modulor 2 in 1955. These works were first published in English as The Modulor in 1954 and Modulor 2 (Let the User Speak Next) in 1958.

The 2004 reprinted box set including both books was printed in a square format using the Modulor with the series twenty seven to one hundred and forty reduced in size to one tenth.

== Commemorative usage ==
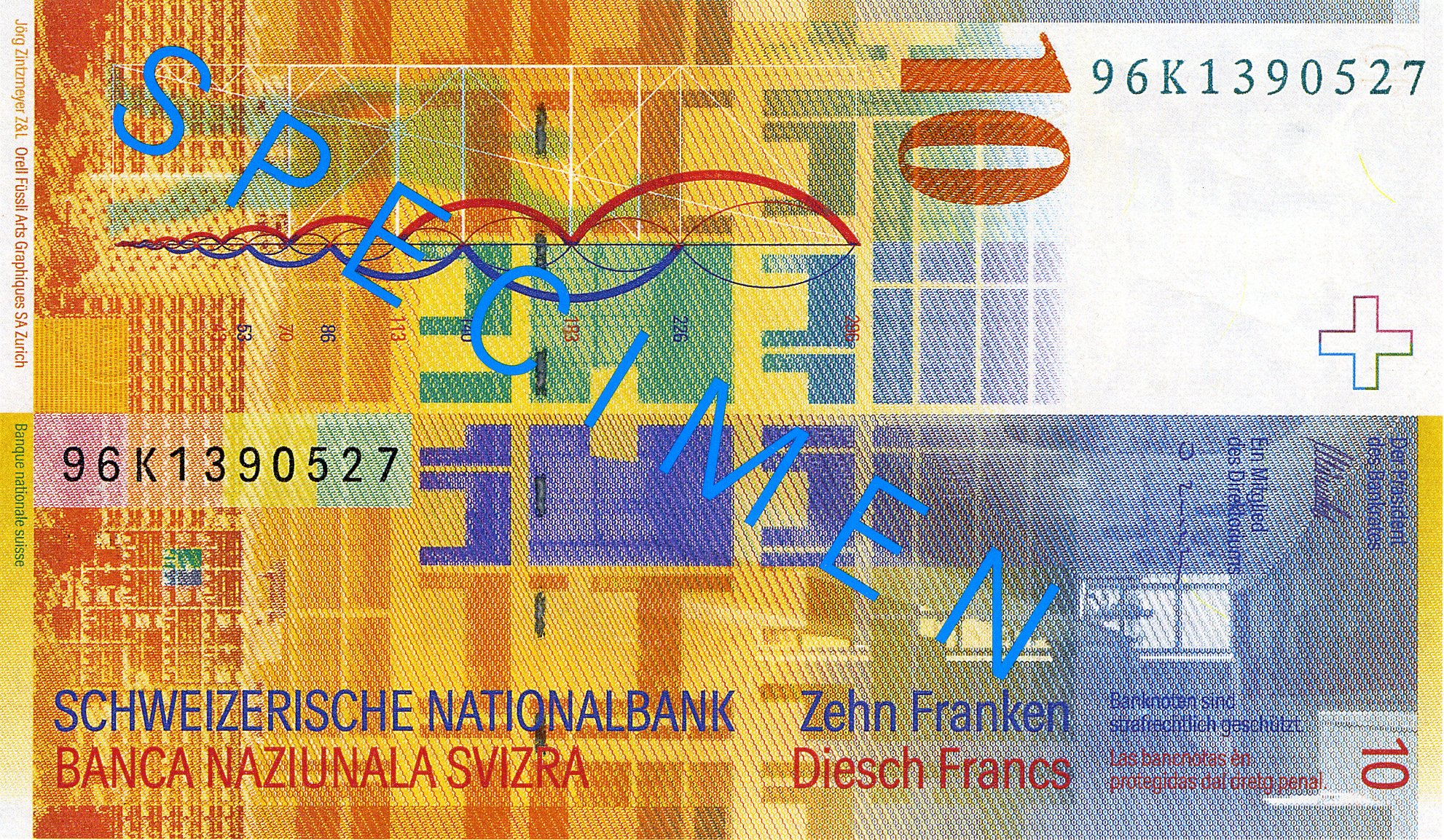
Reverse side of the Swiss 10 CHF banknote, showing the Modulor

- A picture of the Modulor appears on the eighth banknote series on the 10 CHF Swiss banknote dedicated to Le Corbusier.

== See also ==
- Body proportions – Proportions of the human body in art
  - Artistic canons of body proportion – Criteria used in formal figurative art
- Ergonomics – Designing systems to suit their users
- List of unusual units of measurement – Units that are not part of a coherent system
- Preferred number – Selection constraint in industrial design, especially the section about Renard series, which covers a mathematical approach on evenly distributed numbers using geometric sequences, for use in constructing houses or devices.
- Rudolf Wittkower – British art historian (1901–1971)
- Rule of thumb – Approximate method for doing something
