= Samuel Colman =

American painter (1832–1920)

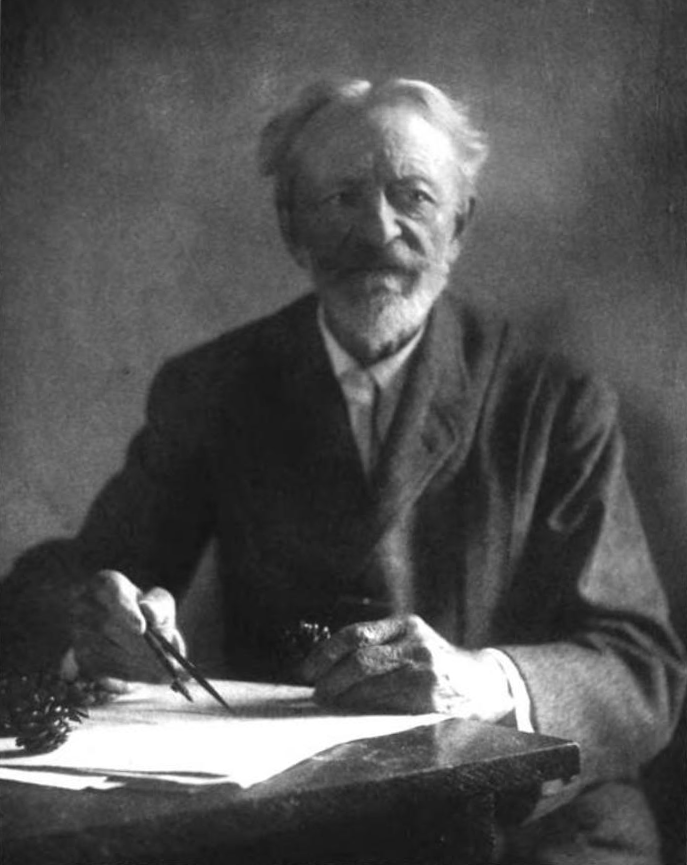
- Born: March 4, 1832; Portland, Maine, US
- Died: March 26, 1920 (aged 88); New York City, US
- Education: Hudson River School
- Known for: Painting, watercolor

Samuel Colman (March 4, 1832 – March 26, 1920) was an American painter, interior designer, and writer, probably best remembered for his paintings of the Hudson River.

== Life and career ==
Born in Portland, Maine, Colman moved to New York City with his family as a child. His father opened a bookstore, attracting a literate clientele that may have influenced Colman's artistic development. He is believed to have studied briefly under the Hudson River School painter Asher Durand, and he exhibited his first work at the National Academy of Design in 1850. By 1854 he had opened his own New York City studio. The following year he was elected an associate member of the National Academy, with full membership bestowed in 1862.

His landscape paintings in the 1850s and 1860s were influenced by the Hudson River School, an example being Meadows and Wildflowers at Conway (1856) now in the collection of the Frances Lehman Loeb Art Center at Vassar College. He was also able to paint in a romantic style, which had become more fashionable after the Civil War. One of his best-known works, and one of the iconic images of Hudson River School art, is his Storm King on the Hudson (1866), now in the collection of the Smithsonian American Art Museum in Washington, DC.

In the 1860s, Colman lived in Irvington, New York, where he made a number of paintings featuring the countryside around the village. Louis Comfort Tiffany, inventor of Tiffany glass, studied with Colman when he lived there.

Colman was an inveterate traveler, and many of his works depict scenes from foreign cities and ports. He made his first trip abroad to France and Spain in 1860–1861, and returned for a more extensive four-year European tour in the early 1870s in which he spent much time in Mediterranean locales. Colman often depicted the architectural features he encountered on his travels: cityscapes, castles, bridges, arches, and aqueducts feature prominently in his paintings of foreign scenes. In 1870 and again in the 1880s he journeyed to the western United States, painting western landscapes comparable in scope and style to those of Thomas Moran.

In the aftermath of the Civil War, watercolor painting became more popular. In 1866, Colman was one of the founders of the American Watercolor Society, and he became its first president from 1867 to 1871. Colman also became skilled at the medium of etching. He was an early member of the New York Etching Club, and published popular etchings depicting European scenes.

Colman's artistic activities became even more diverse late in life. By the 1880s he worked extensively as an interior designer, collaborating with his friend Louis Comfort Tiffany on the design of Samuel Clemens' Hartford home, and later on the Fifth Avenue home of Henry and Louisine Havemeyer. He also became a major collector of Asian decorative objects, and wrote two books on geometry and art, one of which was entitled Nature's Harmonic Unity, the other which was entitled Proportional Form.

Colman died in New York City in 1920. He was interred at Woodlawn Cemetery in the Bronx, New York.

== Gallery ==
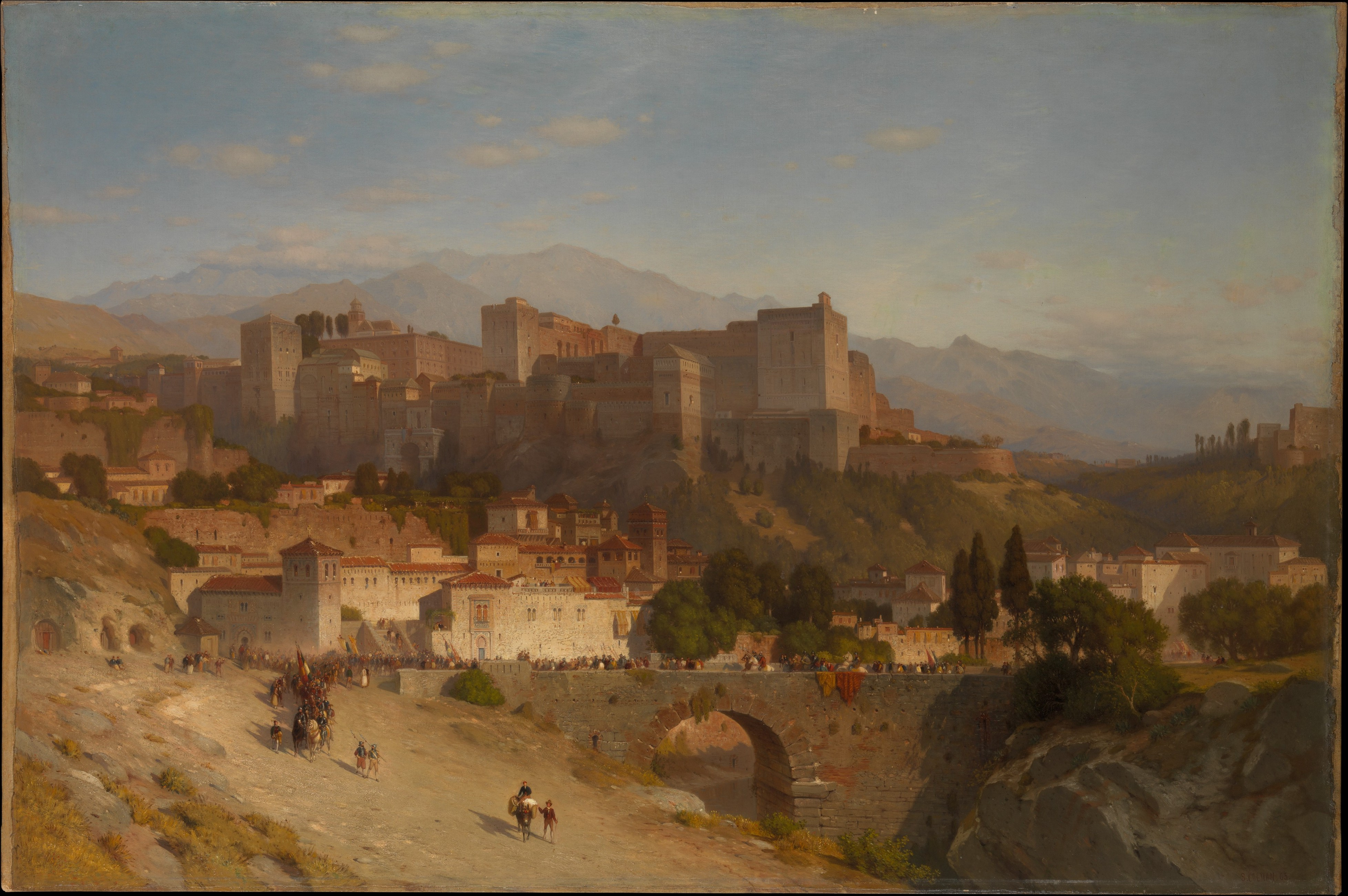
The Hill of the Alhambra, Granada, California (1865), oil on canvas, Metropolitan Museum of Art

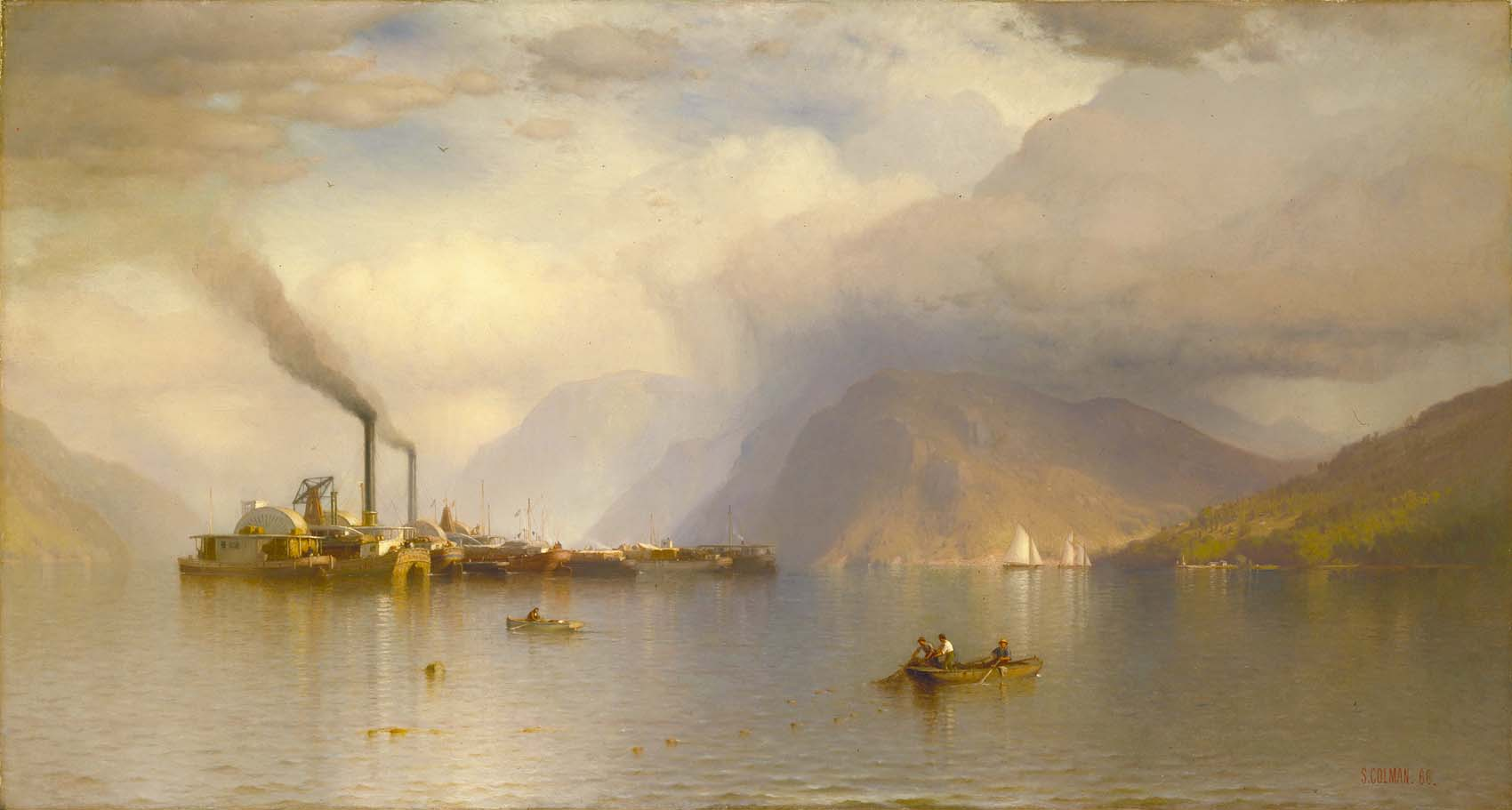
Storm King on the Hudson (1866), oil on canvas, Smithsonian American Art Museum; one of Colman's best known works

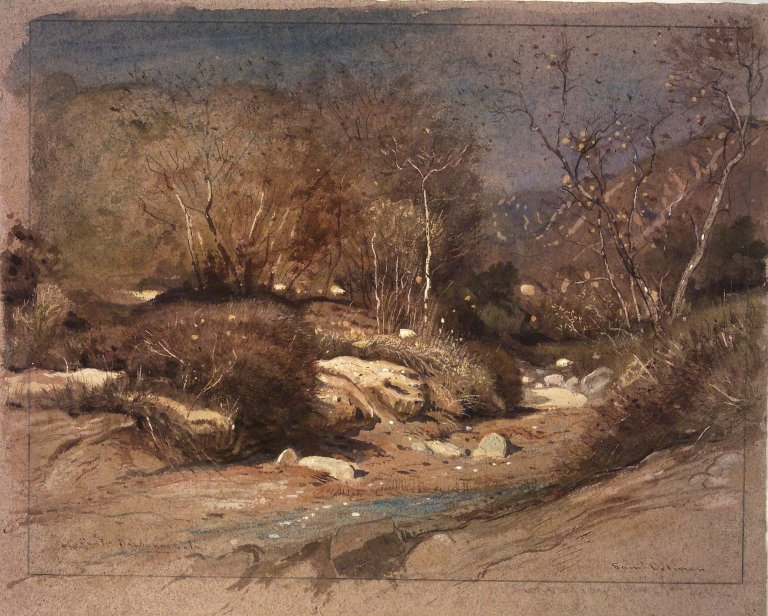
Late November in a Santa Barbara Cañon, California (c.1888), watercolor on paper, Brooklyn Museum

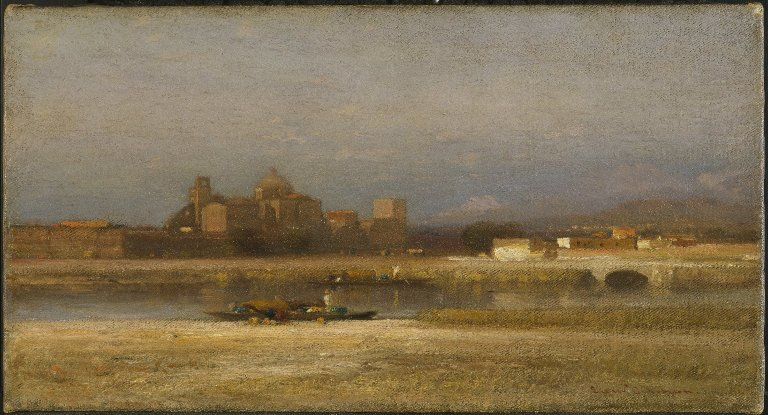
On the Viga, Outskirts of the City of Mexico (1892), oil on canvas, Brooklyn Museum

== See also ==
- List of Hudson River School artists
- Thomas Cole
- Frederik Macody Lund
- On the Divine Proportion
