= Proportion (architecture) =

Principle of architectural theory

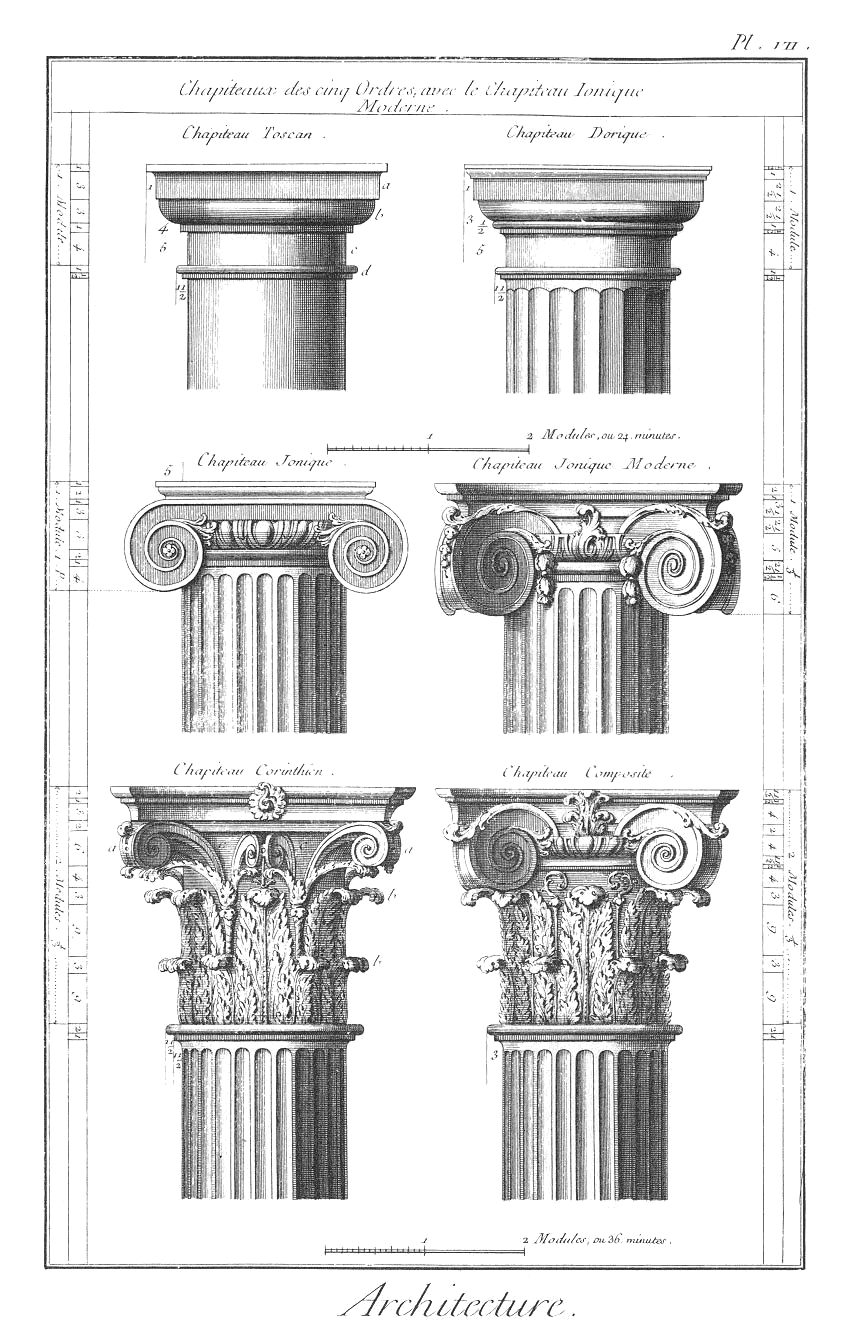
In classical architecture, proportions were set by the radii of columns.

Proportion is a central principle of architectural theory and an important connection between mathematics and art. It is the visual effect of the relationship of the various objects and spaces that make up a structure to one another and to the whole. These relationships are often governed by multiples of a standard unit of length known as a "module".

Proportion in architecture was discussed by Vitruvius, Leon Battista Alberti, Andrea Palladio, and Le Corbusier among others.

== Classical architecture ==
=== Rome ===
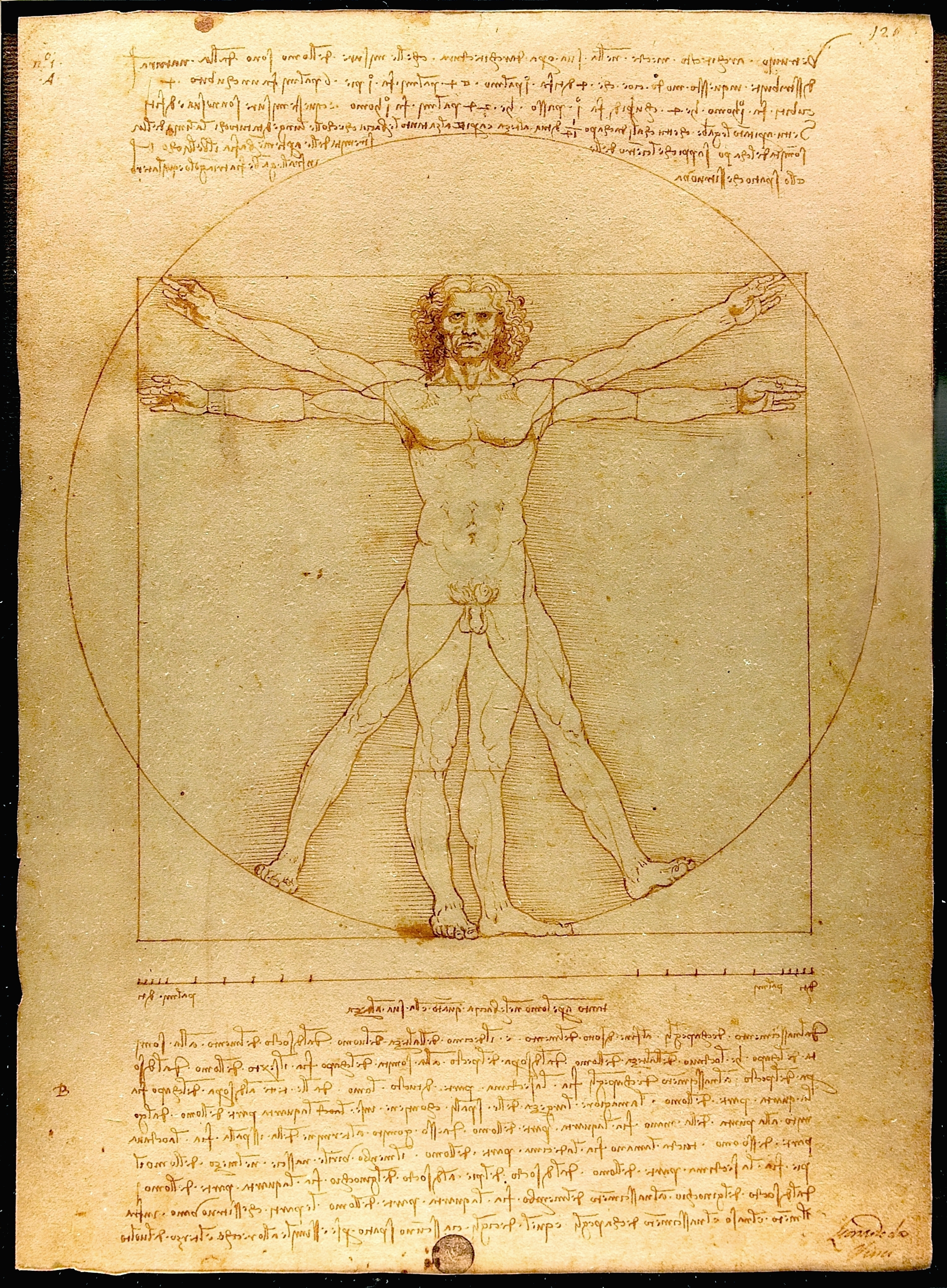
The Vitruvian Man developed by Leonardo da Vinci based on the description of Vitruvius' ideal ratio of the human body.

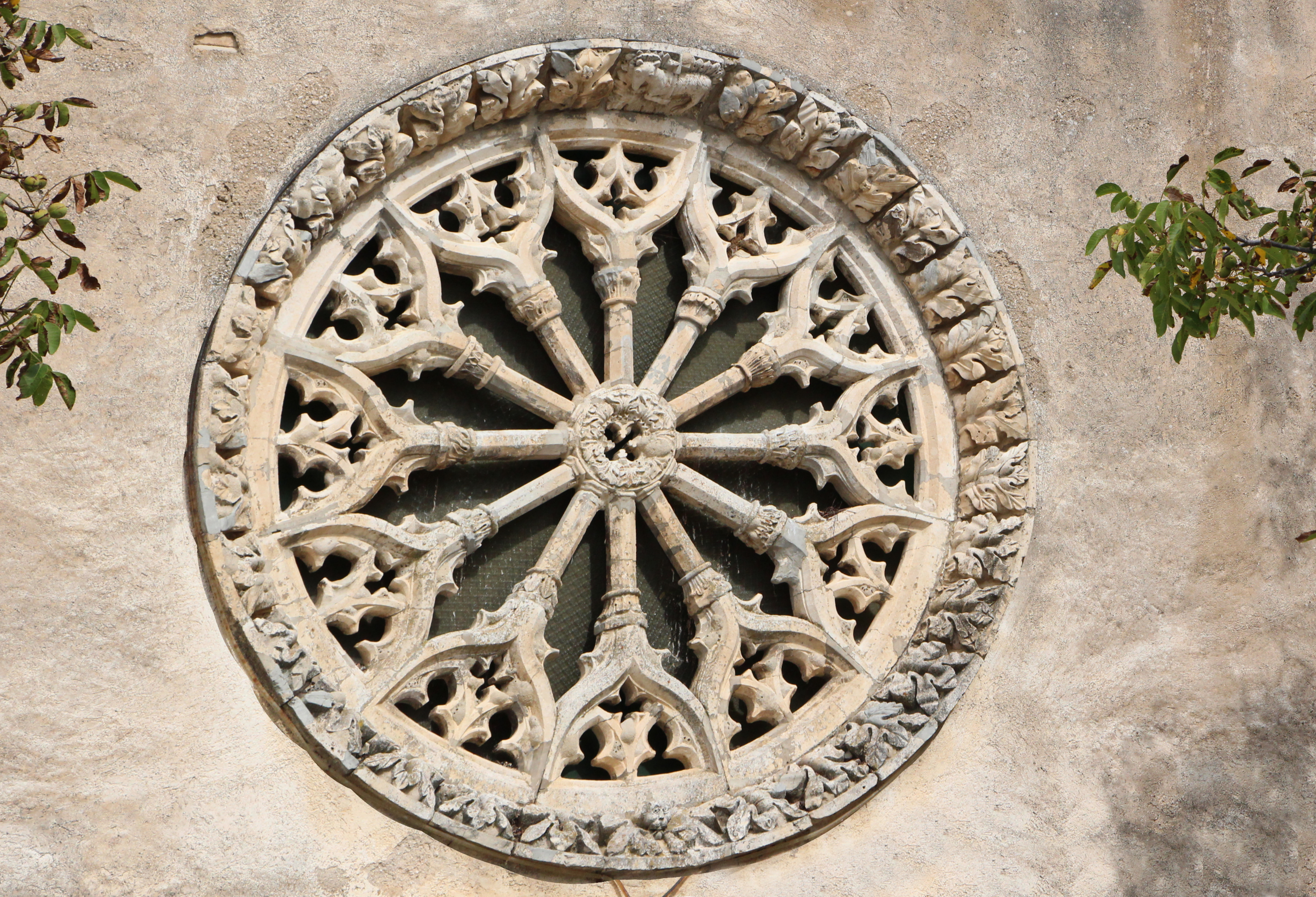
An example of a Gothic window. Note the geometric pattern formed by intersecting circles, in an Ad Triangulum pattern.

In classical architecture, the module was established as the radius of the lower shaft of a classical column, with proportions expressed as a fraction or multiple of that module.

Architecture in Roman antiquity was rarely documented except in Vitruvius' treatise De architectura. Vitruvius served as an engineer under Julius Caesar during the first Gallic Wars (58–50 BC). The treatise was dedicated to Emperor Augustus. As Vitruvius defined the concept in the first chapters of the treatise, he mentioned the three prerequisites of architecture are firmness (firmitas), commodity (utilitas), and delight (venustas), which require the architects to be equipped with a varied kind of learning and knowledge of many branches. Moreover, Vitruvius identified the "Six Principles of Design" as order (ordinatio), arrangement (dispositio), proportion (eurythmia), symmetry (symmetria), propriety (decor) and economy (distributio). Among the six principles, proportion interrelates and supports all the other factors in geometrical forms and arithmetical ratios.

The word symmetria, usually translated to "symmetry" in modern renderings, in ancient times meant something more closely related to "mathematical harmony" and measurable proportions. Vitruvius tried to describe his theory in the makeup of the human body, which he referred to as the perfect or golden ratio. The principles of measurement units, digit, foot, and cubit also came from the dimensions of the Vitruvian Man. More specifically, Vitruvius used the total height of 6 feet of a person, and each part of the body takes up a different ratio. For example, the face is about 1/10 of the total height, and the head is about 1/8 of the total height. Vitruvius used these ratios to prove that the composition of classical orders mimicked the human body, thereby ensuring aesthetic harmonisation when people viewed architectural columns.

== Medieval architecture ==
In medieval European church architecture, builders saw proportion as a means of reflecting divine harmony and cosmic order. The use of proportions was influenced by theology, classical sources, and practical construction methods, and it played a central role in Romanesque and Gothic architecture.

Medieval church builders often relied on simple geometrical figures, such as the square, equilateral triangle, and the circle to generate proportions for plans and elevations. These were seen as symbolic of divine perfection and unity. The square was used to determine the modular unit of the nave and choir. The circle represented eternity and the heavens; often used to design apses, rose windows, and vaulting schemes. The triangle was sometimes employed in roof pitches and façade compositions, and commonly signified the Trinity.

The Ad Quadratum and Ad Triangulum techniques were also often used, especially in the construction of church windows or in determinations of the church's height. Both these techniques start with the circle.

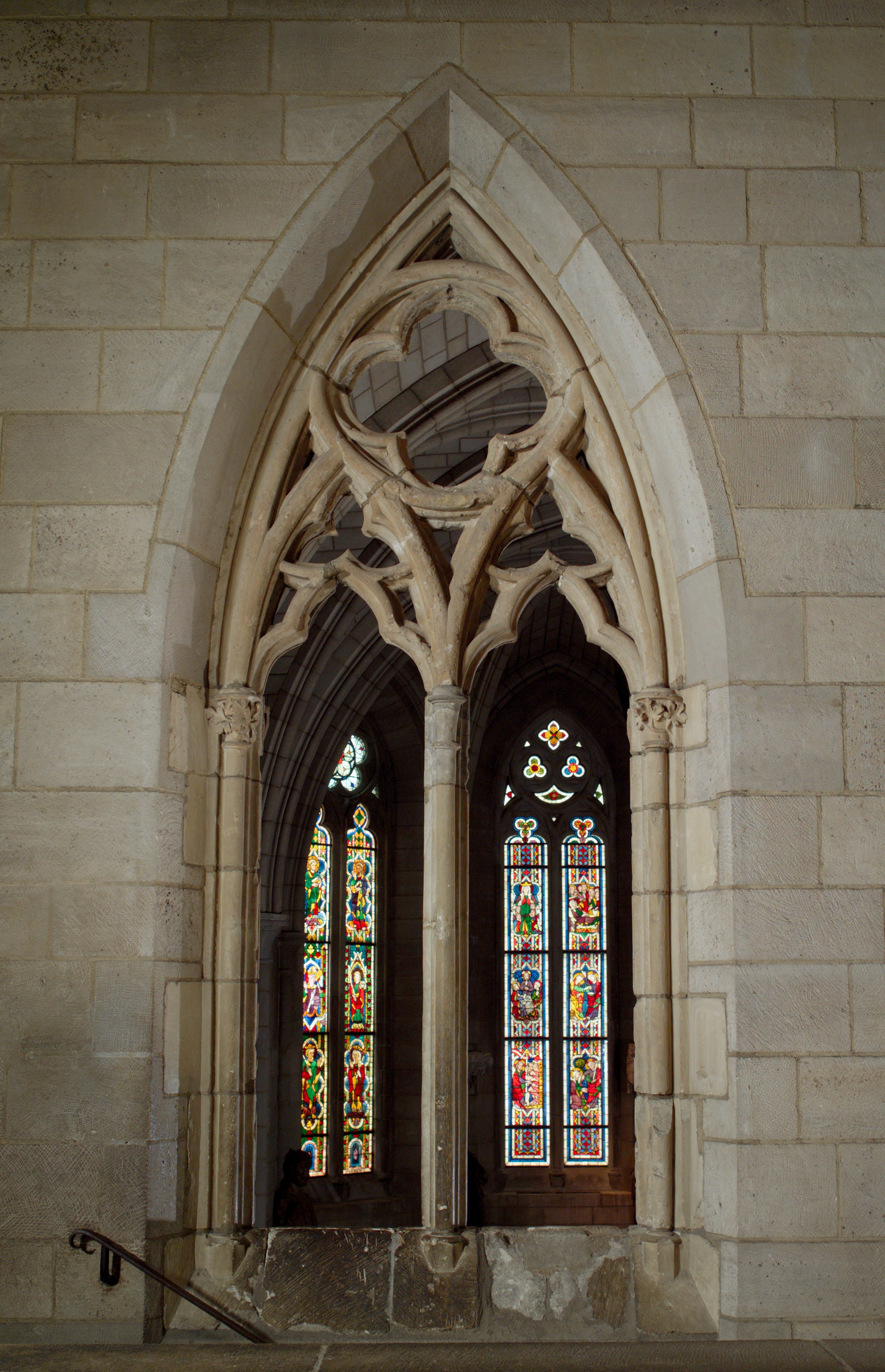
A Lancet Window.

In Ad Quadratum, a square is embedded within the circle such that each corner touches the circumference of said circle. To create an octagon, the square is rotated 45 degrees. The square can then be divided into smaller squares. The pattern produced can be copied and reproduced in any direction.

The Ad Triangulum is similar, though it begins with an equilateral triangle that is rotated 180 degrees about its centroid to produce a hexagon. Further patterns may be produced by further divisions within the triangle, into smaller triangles.

Both these techniques, of the square and the triangle, were also used to determine the proportions of the church's facade.

Certain numerology from the Bible also determined characteristics of the church in some instances. The number 3 often represented the Trinity, 4 earthly order, 7 perfection, or the 12 apostles were some of the times encoded in window divisions.

Lancet windows were commonly in a 2:1 or 3:1 length:width ratio.

== Modern architecture ==
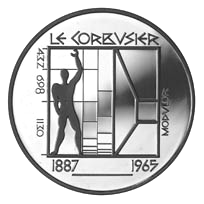
Commemorative coin illustrating Le Corbusier's Modulor

In the 20th century, architectural proportion shifted away from classical harmonic systems and toward approaches shaped by industrial production, structural technology, and functional requirements.

Early modernists relied on proportion derived from grids, modular planning, and standardized construction. Steel and reinforced concrete introduced regular structural spans that became new proportional units.

Designers, including Walter Gropius, used repetitive windows and functional room sizes as proportional frameworks at the Bauhaus.

Some mid-century architects reintroduced human-based proportional systems. Le Corbusier’s Modulor combined anthropometry with the Golden Ratio to guide building dimensions.

In his Le Modulor (1948), Le Corbusier presented a system of proportions which took the golden ratio and a man with a raised arm as the scalable modules of proportion. The human height he decided on was 1.83 metres. This was a then-modern alternative to Vitruvian proportions.

Simple proportions also became en vogue, such as 1:2 or 2:3.

Others developed alternative methods as well. Louis Kahn organized buildings through hierarchies of “served” and “servant spaces, while Alvar Aalto used irregular, material-driven proportions shaped by use and movement.

Late modern and postmodern architects adopted varied approaches to proportion. Michael Graves and Aldo Rossi referenced or abstracted classical ratios. Focusing on the regional context, material clarity was also preferred over fixed numerical systems.

Contemporary proportional systems have emerged from digital modeling, performance criteria, and environmental analysis. Parametric and computational tools allow architects to generate proportions based on data - such as sunlight, structure, and or program - rather than predetermined geometric rules.

== See also ==
- History of architecture
- Mathematics and architecture
- Mathematics and art
