= Frederik Macody Lund =

Norwegian autodidact revisionist historian (1863–1943)

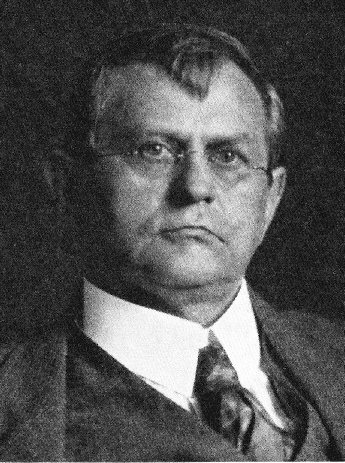
Frederik Macody Lund (1863–1943)

Julius Frederik Macody Lund (born 18 November 1863 – 16 December 1943) was a controversial Norwegian autodidact revisionist historian, most known and remembered for his engagement in the restoration of Nidaros Cathedral.

When architect Christian Christie presented his ideas for a restoration of the west section and the west front, an alternative idea was published by Macody Lund, introducing the screenfront and the rose window. Both of these ideas were included in Olaf Nordhagen's 1907 plan for the restoration of the cathedral.

In 1915 Macody Lund published his theory that Nidaros Cathedral was constructed on the basis of the ideas of the golden ratio. He gained support for this idea in the Parliament of Norway, and received financial aid from the parliament to develop an alternative proposal for the restoration of the west section and the west front, in competition with Nordhagen's work. These "system controversies" led to great delays in the work at the cathedral, as no work could be done before this dispute was settled. Macody Lund published his views in Ad Quadratum (1919). The dispute was settled in 1922, when an international experts commission rejected Macody Lund's theories. In 1923, Stortinget decided to continue the cathedral's restoration based on Nordhagen's plan. The commission's verdict was, however, without a full argumentation. Macody Lund thus saw an opportunity to continue his argument, which he published in Ad Quadratum II: Dom med præmisser over den internasjonale domskommissions dom uten præmisser (1928) ("A verdict with premises on the international experts commission's verdict without premises").

He was given a Lifetime government grant in 1929.

== See also ==
- On the Divine Proportion
- Jay Hambidge
- Samuel Colman
