= The Hedgehog and the Fox (disambiguation) =

The Hedgehog and the Fox may refer to:

- "The Hedgehog and the Fox", 1953 essay by Isaiah Berlin
- "The Hedgehog and the Fox" (fable), alternative version of "The Fox and the Cat", one of Aesop's fables
- The Hedgehog and the Fox (sculpture), 1999 work by Richard Serra

== See also ==
- The Hedgehog, the Fox, and the Magister's Pox, 2003 book by Stephen Jay Gould
