= What Is Your Dangerous Idea? =

2007 book by John Brockman

What Is Your Dangerous Idea: Today's Leading Thinkers on the Unthinkable
- First edition
- Author: John Brockman
- Language: English
- Subject: Philosophy
- Genre: Non-fiction
- Publisher: Simon & Schuster
- Publication date: 2007
- Publication place: United States
- Media type: Print (Hardback and Paperback)
- Pages: 352 pp (first edition, hardback)
- ISBN: 978-0-7432-9553-6 (first edition, hardback)
- OCLC: 70986398
- Preceded by: What We Believe But Cannot Prove: Today's Leading Thinkers on Science in the Age of Certainty
- Followed by: What Are You Optimistic About?: Today's Leading Thinkers on Why Things Are Good and Getting Better

What Is Your Dangerous Idea?: Today's Leading Thinkers on the Unthinkable is a book edited by John Brockman, which deals with "dangerous" ideas, or ideas that some people would react to in ways that suggest a disruption of morality and ethics. Scientists, philosophers, artists, and various other groups of people have written in to the online salon called the Edge, where thinkers in several areas post and discuss their ideas. This collection of responses forms the entirety of the book (possibly with some excluded because of the great number of posts). The basic concept behind the book is "to gather a hundred of the most brilliant minds in the world in a room, lock them in, and have them ask each other the questions they were asking themselves".

== Ideas ==
Members of the Edge Foundation were asked this question in 2006:

The history of science is replete with discoveries that were considered socially, morally, or emotionally dangerous in their time; the Copernican and Darwinian revolutions are the most obvious. What is your dangerous idea? An idea you think about (not necessarily one you originated) that is dangerous not because it is assumed to be false, but because it might be true?

The question was suggested by Steven Pinker, a psychologist.

People answered to this question in entries, some of which lasted several pages. These entries were posted in the Edge community forum. The ideas which were best expressed on the forum were posted in the book, organized according to subject. These ideas cover topics in physics, biology, religion, and other subjects.

Several of the contributors are well-known within the realm of science and philosophy. These include Steven Pinker, Freeman Dyson, Daniel Dennett, Jared Diamond, Brian Greene, Matt Ridley, Howard Gardner, Richard Dawkins, and Martin Rees, as well as many others. Not all of the contributors study the realm of philosophy or science; several contributors are also artists or writers.

=== Psychology ===
The existence of the soul is discussed by John Horgan and Paul Bloom. John Horgan discusses the possibility that the soul does not exist, while Paul Bloom further expands by discussing how the implication of the soul's nonexistence can have serious consequences.

In contrast [to evolution by natural selection], the widespread rejection of the soul would have profound moral and legal consequences. It would also require people to rethink what happens when they die, and give up the idea (held by some 90 percent of Americans) that their souls will survive the death of their bodies and ascend to heaven. It is hard to get more dangerous than that. —Paul Bloom

Another topic many entries were based on is human behavior. J. Craig Venter discussed the genetic base of how humans act; Jerry Coyne also wrote on the idea that people are predisposed to act in certain ways because of genetics.

Several authors wrote on the morals of people, consciousness, and human values. Many authors discussed how ideas themselves can be dangerous, or the idea that ideas can be dangerous. One such author, Daniel Gilbert, states, in his entry:

"Dangerous" does not mean exciting or bold; it means likely to cause great harm. The most dangerous idea is the only dangerous idea: The idea that ideas can be dangerous. —Daniel Gilbert

=== Biology ===
Several key ideas in biology were written about in the book, such as genetics, other life in the universe, and the origin of life. The origin of life was discussed by two authors, Robert Shapiro and George Dyson. Robert Shapiro believes that the origin of life will be found in the next five years, and George Dyson believes that we do not need to understand the origin of life to make progress in molecular biology.

The origin of life would be a natural (and perhaps frequent) result of the physical laws that govern the universe. This latter thought falls directly in line with the idea of cosmic evolution, which asserts that events since the Big Bang have moved almost inevitably in the direction of life. No miracle or immense stroke of luck was needed to get it started. If this turns out to be the case, then we should expect to be successful when we search for life beyond this planet. We are not the only life that inhabits this universe. —Robert Shapiro

=== Physics ===
The anthropic principle was discussed by Leonard Susskind as well as Carlo Rovelli, who mentions it in his essay. The anthropic principle claims that the universe is the way it is because if it was not specifically like how we see it, we would not be here to describe it. Leonard Susskind expands by talking about the idea that the anthropic principle can be seen as a threat to the mentality that every law governing the cosmos is set in stone; thus being unalterable.

What further worries many physicists is that the landscape may be so rich that almost anything can be found - any combination of physical constants, particle masses, and so forth. This, they fear, would eliminate the predictive power of physics. Environmental facts are nothing more than environmental facts. They worry that if everything is possible, there will be no way to falsify the theory - or, more to the point, no way to confirm it. —Leonard Susskind

Susskind expresses in his entry the possibility that our universe is not the only universe (also expressed in an idea labeled "The Multiverse"). This is an idea where a large amount of universes are located in "the Landscape"; he expands by communicating that each universe has different physics laws that govern each of them, as can be seen in the quote above. The anthropic principle is also present in the idea. He claims, for example, that we are only here because our universe has the precise set of laws of physics that it has, and that very few universes have the laws of physics needed for intelligent life.

=== Beliefs ===
Several different beliefs were mentioned in the essays such as the relationship between science and religion. Sam Harris, in his essay titled "Science Must Destroy Religion," discusses different types of reason and belief as well as the conflict between science and religion.

The conflict between religion and science is inherent and (very nearly) zero-sum. The success of science often comes at the expense of religious dogma; the maintenance of religious dogma always comes at the expense of science. —Sam Harris

== Response ==
According to Jill Murphy, a reviewer of the website "The Bookbag", What is Your Dangerous Idea? provides an easy-to-understand explanation of the topics covered in this book. She expands by writing that the ideas make the reader think about them.

The joy in this book is that it is easy to understand. Science duffer that I am, I had no difficulty with any of the concepts or theories. The Edge contributors really had exceeded their game. These ideas don't challenge the reader to understand them; they challenge the reader to think about them.

The book has also been likened to "Shakespearean science" by one reviewer, due to the similar qualities it holds with William Shakespeare's works.

The result is definitely a "dessert island book"—one you would choose if marooned on an island—because most of the short answers provoke enough speculation and wonderment in your own mind to last a lifetime. You would take it for the same reasons you'd take Shakespeare—beauty and universality. Shakespeare of course has on his own already expressed poetically what these thinkers say as a matter of science; but these ones cite research.

Another reviewer summarized the various ideas, concluding that science's progress may make us realize our limits.

And so we are left with our final dangerous idea: Science's long journey down the corridors of knowledge has led us back to the realms of mystery and wonder. A method of inquiry that promised us mastery may ultimately remind us of our limits.

Stephen Totilo, on MTV.com relates the book to gaming, in his article titled "Could Xbox Destroy the World?" The essay by Geoffrey Miller was discussed in how its topic (Fermi's paradox) could relate to how much people game. Miller states that the cause of the paradox might be that aliens become addicted to video games.

== See also ==
- What We Believe But Cannot Prove: Today's Leading Thinkers on Science in the Age of Certainty
- The Third Culture: Beyond the Scientific Revolution
- Intelligent Thought: Science Versus the Intelligent Design Movement
- The Next Fifty Years: Science in the First Half of the Twenty-First Century
- Edge Foundation, Inc.

== Endnotes ==
=== References ===
- Brockman, John (2007). What is Your Dangerous Idea?: Today's Leading Thinkers on the Unthinkable. New York: Harper Perennial. ISBN 978-0-06-121495-0.
