= Hedgehogs in culture =

Hedgehogs have appeared widely in popular and folk culture, particularly in Europe, one of their native continents. Though not native to Oceania, hedgehogs have been introduced to New Zealand, leading to their appearance in New Zealand's culture. With many prominent roles in folktales, hedgehogs are also common in modern culture and media, with appearances in books, video games, television shows, and films.

== Europe ==
As animals native to Europe and Africa, hedgehogs hold a place in European folklore.

In most European countries, hedgehogs are believed to be a hard-working, no-nonsense animal. This is partially derived from the myth that hedgehogs collect apples and mushrooms and carry them to their secret storage.

It is unclear exactly how old this belief is, though the Roman author Pliny the Elder mentions hedgehogs gathering grapes by this method in his Naturalis Historia. In the Prophecies of Merlin, as recounted by Geoffrey of Monmouth in the 12th century, several references are made to hedgehogs carrying apples, while in medieval bestiaries and other illuminated manuscripts dating from at least the 13th century onwards, hedgehogs are shown rolling on and impaling fruit to carry back to their dens. However, hedgehogs do not gather food to store for later consumption, relying on their deposited fat to survive hibernation. Nor is apple included in their usual diet (it has been suggested, however, that the hedgehogs may use the juice of wild apples to get rid of parasites, similar to anting). The image remains an irresistible one to modern illustrators. Therefore, hedgehogs are often portrayed carrying apples – partially, to make them look cuter.

Hedgehogs are often pictured as fond of milk; as late as the 19th century, some English villagers even believed that these creatures would suck milk out of cows' udders. In reality, however, hedgehogs are lactose-intolerant.

Hedgehogs are also often seen in pictures with an autumn-themed background since the animal hibernates in piles of leaves. This also adds to the cute reputation of hedgehogs. In Great Britain, however, the human habit of lighting bonfires to celebrate Bonfire Night on 5 November has led to an increased risk to hedgehogs, who often choose to sleep in the piles of wood accumulated in gardens and parks beforehand. Television messages now remind viewers who might be lighting bonfires to check them first for the presence of hibernating hedgehogs.

During the 1970s and 1980s, hedgehogs were one of the poster animals for environment activists throughout Europe. A large number of hedgehogs were killed by traffic, and since the hedgehog was widely seen as a cute, friendly animal, the choice was effective.

In a Veps legend, the (female) hedgehog appears in a creation myth. According to it, early on, there was no dry land; the entire world was just a big lake. It was a giant hedgehog that brought soil and sand with its needles, creating dry land.

A hedgehog plays a role in a Lithuanian and Latvian creation story as well: when God made heaven and earth, he did not take good measurements, so the earth was made larger than the heaven; on the hedgehog's wise suggestion, God squeezed the earth, so that it would fit into the heaven. (In some versions of the legend, the process of "shrinking" the earth resulted in the creation of mountain ranges). To reward the clever hedgehog, God equipped him with a suite of needles. A similar legend is attested among the Banat Bulgarians and Romanians as well.

The wisdom of the hedgehog is presented in other folk legends in the Balkans as well. In a Bulgarian legend, the Sun decided to marry the Moon and invited all the animals to the wedding. The hedgehog was the only one who failed to appear. The Sun went to look for the hedgehog and found him gnawing on a stone. When the Sun inquired what he was doing, the hedgehog explained: "I am learning to eat stones. Once you marry, you'll have many Sun children born to you, and when they all shine in the sky, everything will burn, and there will be nothing to eat". The Sun then decided to call off the wedding, and the world's inhabitants were saved from starvation.

In the Balkan Slavic and Belarusian folklore, the wise hedgehog (along with the tortoise) sometimes appears as the animal capable of finding the raskovnik, a magic plant that could be used to open locks and to find hidden treasures.

In many Balkan (Bulgarian, Macedonian, Greek) folk songs the (male) hedgehog often appears romantically interested in a (female) tortoise. His advances are usually unwelcome, and the tortoises often resort to legal means to deal with the harasser.

== United States ==
Hedgehogs remain largely unseen in modern-day American culture. On several occasions, British educational programmes have been revised to refer to hedgehogs as porcupines (at least one such example being Bob the Builder and Littlest Pet Shop). The Wacky Wheels video game makes humorous use of hedgehogs as projectiles, and they are also seen reading the newspaper while sitting on the toilet in the middle of the race course.

One notable exception is Sonic the Hedgehog, the video game character created by Yuji Naka and Naoto Ohshima for SEGA.

May has been designated Hedgehog Month by the International Hedgehog Association.

== Oceania ==
New Zealand's McGillicuddy Serious Party were unsuccessful in their attempt to get a hedgehog elected to Parliament. Also in New Zealand, hedgehogs feature in the Bogor cartoon by Burton Silver, via which they also appeared on a postage stamp. Meanwhile, Nikki Slade Robinson and James Antoniou's children's picture book "Hedgehog Heart", published by New Zealand's Duck Creek Press, uses a hedgehog as a metaphor.

== Technology ==
A hedgehog transformer is an early type of electrical transformer designed to work at audio frequencies (AF). They resemble hedgehogs in size, colour and shape and were used in the first part of the 20th century.

== Cuisine ==
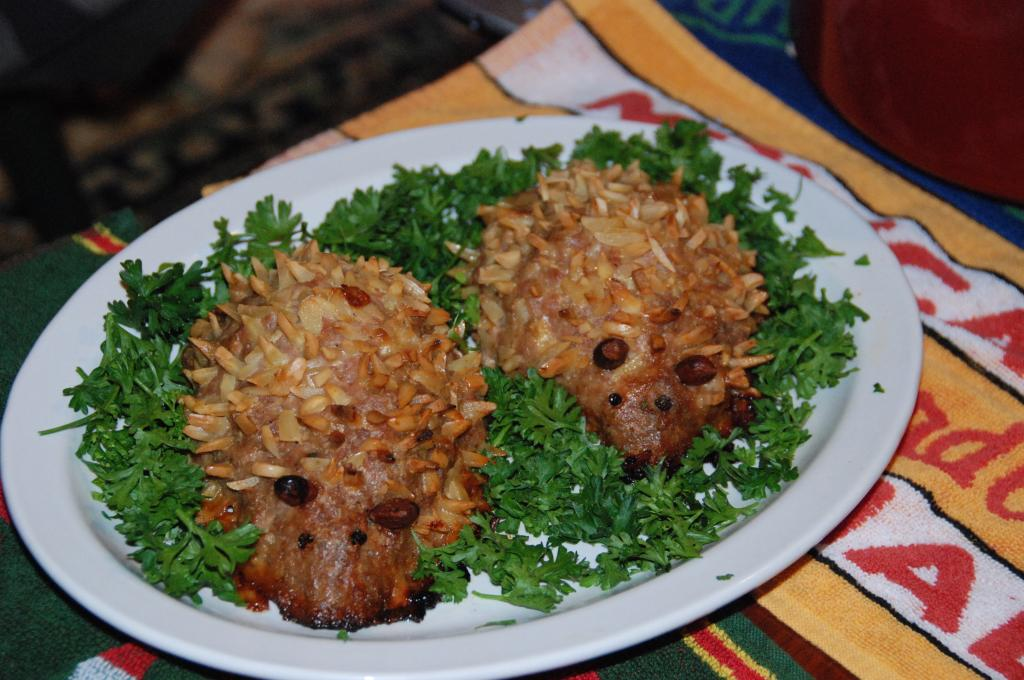
Pork hedgehogs with slivered almond quills

A "hedgehog cake" recipe appears in English cookbooks as early as the 18th century.

"Hedgehogs" may also be created by moulding ground meat in a teardrop shape, embedding pastry slivers or slivered almonds in the surface to resemble quills, and adding eyes and ears of peppercorns, olives, or whole almonds. The technique dates back to at least 1390 and was referenced in an episode of Two Fat Ladies.

== Hedgehogs in popular culture ==
=== In books ===
- In Good to Great by James C. Collins, he describes a fundamental attribute of successful businesses as their "Hedgehog Concept".
- "Hans My Hedgehog" is a German fairy tale collected by the Brothers Grimm. A wealthy but childless merchant wishes he had a child, even a hedgehog, and comes home to find that his wife has given birth to a baby boy who is a hedgehog from the waist up. After many trials Hans My Hedgehog marries a princess and becomes a handsome young man. An even more popular tale in this collection, "The Hare and the Hedgehog", is about the race between a hare, who is proud of his swift legs, and a hedgehog. The hedgehog teams up with his wife who hides on the other side of the field across which the hare and the hedgehog are to race. The hedgehog does not race all the way but simply cowers in his furrow after a few steps. When the hare has crossed the field, Mrs. Hedgehog raises her head on the other side and announces "I am here already." They repeat the race until finally, the hare dies of exhaustion. The story illustrates the dangers of pride on the side of the hare who cannot overcome the common hedgehog's cunning.
- The French author the Comtesse de Ségur devotes a chapter in the children's classic Les petites filles modèles to a story featuring hedgehogs. A mother hedgehog and her three offspring are killed by a caretaker because, as he explains it, they destroy little rabbits and partridges, to the great consternation of the children in the story.
- In Alice's Adventures in Wonderland, the Queen of Hearts uses hedgehogs and flamingoes to play croquet.
- Beatrix Potter's Mrs. Tiggy-Winkle stars a hedgehog.
- Two hedgehogs of the school-child age feature in Kenneth Grahame's The Wind in the Willows.
- In the 1927 British detective novel The Ellerby Case by John Rhode, in the chapter entitled "The Green Hedgehog," Doctor Lancelot Priestly, the investigator who solves the case, is nearly murdered by a hedgehog dyed green whose spines have been impregnated with a virulent poison.
- British author Terry Pratchett incorporates hedgehogs into several of his Discworld novels, and one of the characters is known for singing a lewd song called "The Hedgehog Can Never Be Buggered at All".
- Jan Brett has featured a hedgehog as the main character in many of her books, including The Mitten and Hedgie's Surprise.
- Hedgehogs are common characters in Brian Jacques's book series, Redwall.
- Dick King-Smith has written a story for younger children about a family of hedgehogs threatened by traffic, The Hodgeheg.
- In The Animals of Farthing Wood by British author Colin Dann, several hedgehogs were part of the group of animals that travelled from Farthing Wood to the nature reserve White Deer Park. The oldest two hedgehogs were run over on a motorway near the end of the journey. The rest of the hedgehogs safely made it to White Deer Park and appeared sporadically in the remainder of the series. In the television adaptation, only two hedgehogs were part of the group. As in the novel, both were killed on the motorway.
- Isaiah Berlin, in The Hedgehog and the Fox, takes the hedgehog as the type of person who knows "one big thing", as opposed to the fox, who knows many things. This was taken from a poem by Archilochus.
- Similarly, Stephen Jay Gould refers to a persistent sticking to one strategy, "hedgehog-like" behaviour in his discourse on the humanities versus science in The Hedgehog, the Fox, and the Magister's Pox.
- In Rudyard Kipling's Just So Stories, a Hedgehog named Stickly-Prickly is one of the main protagonists in the story "The Beginning of the Armadillos".
- One of the most popular book-length children's poems in Serbian is Branko Ćopić's Ježeva kućica, (The Hedgehog's Little House)
- Fuzzypeg, a friend of Little Grey Rabbit.
- Yona, the Hedgehog, is a mythical character in Richard Adams' Watership Down.
- Shakespeare referenced hedgehogs in The Tempest and Midsummer Night’s Dream. He referred to them as "hedgepigs" and "urchins."
- Kiroileva siili (Finnish for "The swearing hedgehog") is a comic strip written and drawn by Finnish artist Milla Paloniemi.

=== In other media ===
- The Sonic the Hedgehog franchise, owned by Sega, focuses on the adventures of Sonic, an anthropomorphic hedgehog known for his cobalt fur, namesake speed, and love of freedom and adventure. The franchise is primarily focused on video games, however, there have been multiple animated spin-offs, a live-action/CGI-hybrid movie series, and multiple comic series. There are also four other hedgehog characters that have persisted across the series and its spin-offs — Amy Rose, Shadow, Silver, and Metal Sonic (who is not necessarily a hedgehog, but a robot made in Sonic's likeness, as the name suggests). Spinoff media has included other hedgehog characters — usually family to, or alternate versions of, Sonic or Amy.
- Crazy Hedgy is a video game starring the titular hedgehog character.
- In the Nintendo game Animal Crossing, the Able Sisters are 2 female hedgehogs that own a tailor shop for the player to purchase some clothing. In Animal Crossing: City Folk, a third Able sister was introduced named Labelle (also known in later instalments as Label).
- The Mysteries of Alfred Hedgehog stars an anthropomorphised hedgehog.
- Mr. Pricklepants is an animated, stuffed toy hedgehog from the 2010 Disney/Pixar film Toy Story 3, who likes to act in stage plays. He is voiced by actor Timothy Dalton.
- Lindsfarne Dewclaw, from the online comic strip Kevin and Kell, is a hedgehog. She is highly intelligent and is studying to be a scientist, fascinated with genetics, astronomy and spaceflight. She has recently graduated from university with her bachelor's degree and married her high school sweetheart Fenton Fuscus, a bat.
- Jeż Jerzy (George the Hedgehog in English) is a Polish comic book title written by Rafał Skarżycki and drawn by Tomasz Lew Leśniak.
- Igel Ärgern is a popular German board game, first published in 1990 by Doris Matthaus & Frank Nestel (the makers of Ursuppe). The title roughly translates as "Hedgehog Irking," but the game is usually called "Hedgehogs in a Hurry" in English. In the game, each player races a team of four hedgehogs across a track, avoiding mud pits and occasionally piling atop one another.
- In a 1970 episode of Monty Python's Flying Circus, there was a fake news profile of a crime lord named Dinsdale Piranha, a notorious criminal known for nailing people's heads to the floor. Piranha believed a giant invisible hedgehog named "Spiny Norman" was following him everywhere, and when he came to believe Spiny Norman was hiding out in an aeroplane hangar, he blew the hangar up with a nuclear bomb. During the closing credits of the show, Spiny Norman is seen stalking London and shouting "Dinsdale!"
- In 1981 an Album called "Hedgehog Sandwich" was released by BBC Records, featuring comedy sketches from the Not the Nine O'Clock News television series.
- In the Israeli version of Sesame Street, Rechov Sumsum, one of the main characters was a pink human-sized, orange-spiked hedgehog named "Kippy Ben Kippod " (Kippy Hedgehogson). The same character later appeared in the Israeli/Palestinian co-production of the series, Rechov Sumsum Shara'a Simsim.
- In the Spanish version of Sesame Street, one of the main characters was a pink human-sized hedgehog called "Espinete" (Little spine).
- In the anime Saint Tail, the main character Haneoka Meimi acquires a pet brown hedgehog named Ruby while in her titular alter ego of the superthief Saint Tail. Ruby helps Saint Tail out on one caper, is the inspiration for one of the latter's magic tricks, and acts as a mascot.
- In the UK, the magazine Old Glory (which covers the vintage vehicle preservation movement) had a cartoon strip called Hedgehogs Revenge. It featured hedgehogs destroying steamrollers in various creative ways, including driving one off a cliff. The strip was part of the Young Restorers page ran in the 1990's, and was drawn by someone known only as "AJ".

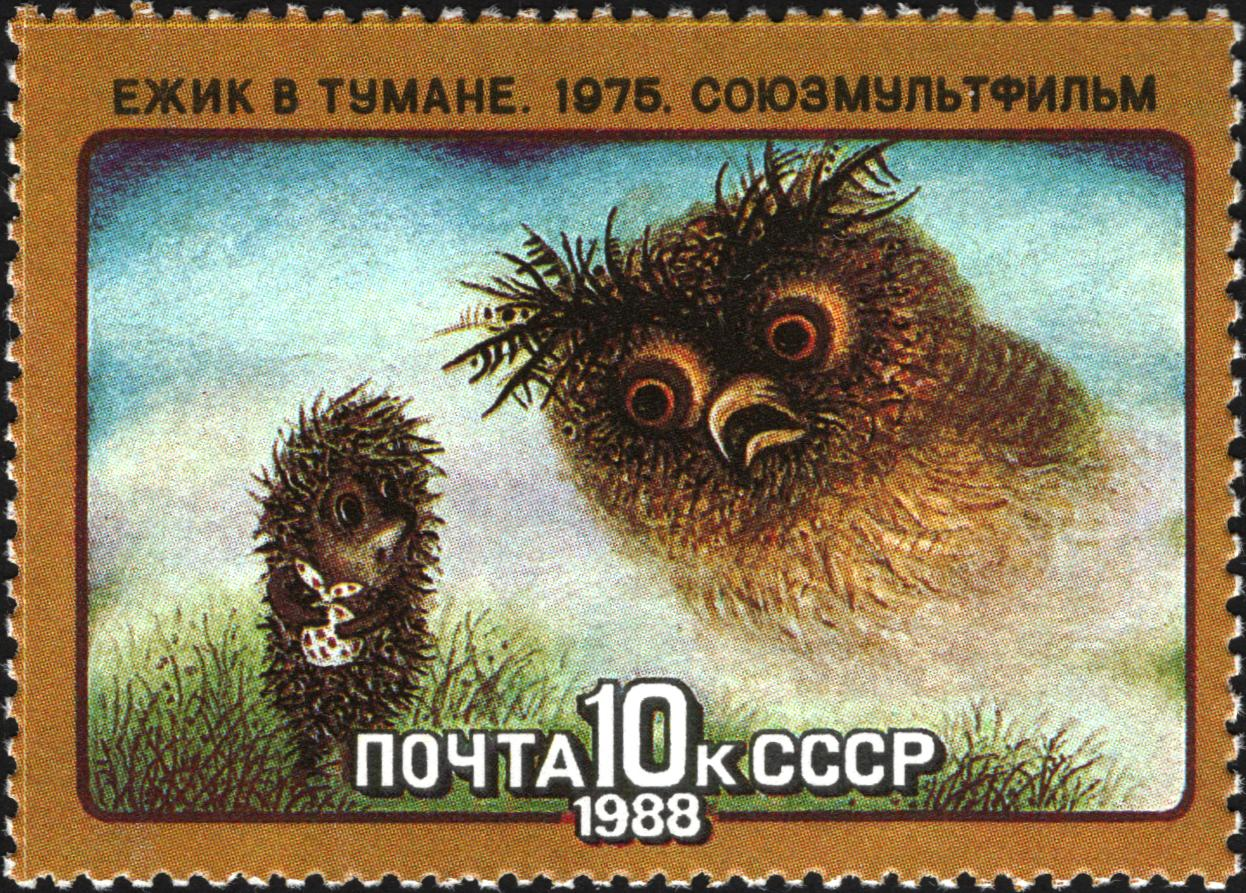
Hedgehog in the Fog commemorated on a Soviet postage stamp

- Hedgehog in the Fog is a 1975 animation directed by Yuriy Norshteyn about a hedgehog who travels through a very foggy wood to visit his friend, a bear.
- Harry Hedgehog is an enemy on Yoshi's Island. He is an enemy that runs around and extends his quills when Yoshi gets near.
- Mega Man 3 on the NES had a robotic hedgehog enemy in Needleman's stage, referred to as "Needle Harry" in Nintendo Power. In Mega Man II on the Game Boy, this enemy returns along with Needleman, and in the "list of enemies" at the end is referred to as "Hari Harry" (note that in Japanese a hedgehog is a "harinezumi" or a "needle mouse"). It attacks by firing its spines, and can also roll, during which it is invulnerable.
- In the "Timeless Time" episode of the BBC television show One Foot in the Grave, Victor, on his way back into the house in the early morning hours after returning from turning off his faulty car alarm, accidentally steps into a rotting hedgehog and walks it into the house, like a slipper.
- A series of animated road safety advertisements featuring a family of hedgehogs aired between 1997 and the mid-2000s on various British television channels, as part of the Think! road safety campaign of the British government. The ads (e.g. King of the Road, Stayin' Alive, Glow in the Dark, Green Man, etc.) were aimed primarily at a child audience, teaching them about the basics of road safety through songs and the younger hedgehogs' humorous misadventures. A promotional website supplemented the television advertisements. It was relaunched in 2003, along with the redesigned version of the ads, but discontinued in 2008. An officially archived version survives.
- In Katekyo Hitman Reborn, Kyoya Hibari uses a hedgehog nicknamed Roll as one of his signature weapons besides his tonfas.
- In the final episode of the second series of British sitcom Bottom, Richie mistakenly believes that Red Indians eat hedgehogs and Eddie Hitler mistakes a hedgehog for a womble.
- The Incredible String Band has a song called "The Hedgehog's Song" in their album The 5000 Spirits or the Layers of the Onion. It was written by Mike Heron.
- In Littlest Pet Shop, Russell Ferguson (voiced by Samuel Vincent), is a male orange hedgehog and the organizer of the group. Usually, he keeps everyone in the Littlest Pet Shop on track, making sure the others won't wreck it in the process. He is often mistaken for a porcupine.
- In the 2012 film The Hobbit: An Unexpected Journey, the wizard Radagast has a pet hedgehog named Sebastian.
- A hedgehog named Russell is one of the major characters in the film Once Upon A Forest.
