= Martin Ford (author) =

American futurist and author

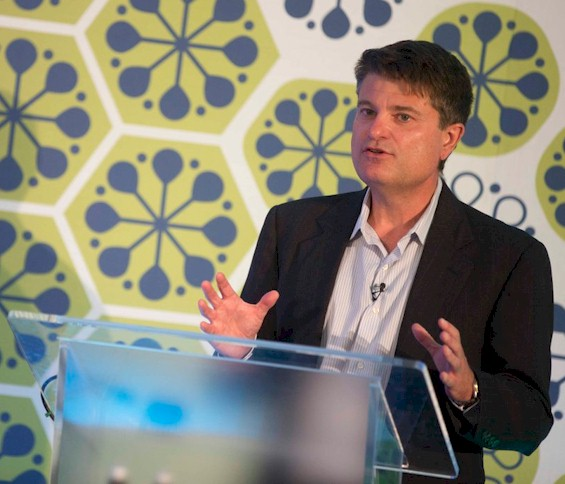
- Ford speaking at the Tata Communications CEO Summit in Ascot, UK in July 2016
- Education: University of Michigan (BSE); UCLA Anderson School of Management (MBA)
- Known for: Author of New York Times Bestseller, Rise of the Robots: Technology and the Threat of a Jobless Future
- Awards: 2015 Financial Times and McKinsey Business Book of the Year Award
- Scientific career
- Fields: Futurist and author focusing on artificial intelligence, robotics and the impact on employment, society and the economy
- Website: mfordfuture.com

Martin Ford is an American futurist and author focusing on artificial intelligence and robotics, and the impact of these technologies on the job market, economy and society.

He has written four books on technology. His 2015 book, Rise of the Robots: Technology and the Threat of a Jobless Future, was a New York Times bestseller and won the £30,000 Financial Times and McKinsey Business Book of the Year Award.

In Ford's most recent book, Rule of the Robots: How Artificial Intelligence Will Transform Everything (2021), he argues that AI is a systemic, general-purpose technology that will ultimately compare to electricity in terms of its impact on the economy and society. Ford argues that AI will be one of humanity's most consequential technologies, transforming virtually every industry and aspect of civilization, and that it will be critical driver of increased innovation and creativity that will lead to future advances across a broad range of fields in science, engineering and medicine.

Ford's previous book, Architects of Intelligence: The Truth about AI from the People Building It (2018) consists of conversations with the most prominent research scientists and entrepreneurs working in the field of artificial intelligence, including Demis Hassabis, Geoffrey Hinton, Ray Kurzweil, Yann LeCun, Yoshua Bengio, Nick Bostrom, Fei-Fei Li, Rodney Brooks, Andrew Ng, Stuart J. Russell and many others. The conversations recorded in the book delve into the future of artificial intelligence, the path to human-level AI (or artificial general intelligence), and the risks associated with progress in AI.

His first book, The Lights in the Tunnel: Automation, Accelerating Technology and the Economy of the Future (2009) also dealt with the effects of automation resulting from advances in artificial intelligence, and the potential for structural unemployment and dramatically increasing inequality.

Ford earned a BSE in computer engineering, magna cum laude, from the University of Michigan, Ann Arbor, and a graduate business degree from the UCLA Anderson School of Management.

== Author and futurist ==
In 2009, Ford published The Lights in the Tunnel, making a strong argument that advances in robotics and artificial intelligence would eventually make a large fraction of the human workforce obsolete.

Ford predicted in his 2009 book that "artificial intelligence will be the next Killer App" and would become a central focus of Silicon Valley. By 2016, major firms like Google, Microsoft, Facebook and Apple were in an intense talent war for AI experts, and Google's CEO had proclaimed that artificial intelligence represented an "inflection point" and that Google would be an "AI-first" company.

In his second book, Rise of the Robots (2015), he argues that the growth of automation threatens many highly educated people, like lawyers, radiologists, and software designers. Rise of the Robots is a New York Times bestseller and has been translated into 19 languages.

In addition to his books, Ford has written for numerous publications including The New York Times, the Financial Times, Harvard Business Review, and The Washington Post. He speaks frequently to industry, academic and government audiences, and has presented his ideas at major events attended by global thought leaders, such as the TED Conference, the Milken Institute's Global Conference, the Festival of Dangerous Ideas, held annually at the Sydney Opera House, the St. Gallen Symposium in Switzerland, and the Asian Leadership Conference in Seoul. Ford has spoken to or consulted with various governments, and in July 2016 he participated in a conversation with the White House Chief of Staff about the potential impact of robotics and artificial intelligence on the U.S. economy and workforce that was live-streamed from the White House.

Ford's first two books both focus on the fact that widespread automation could potentially undermine economic growth or lead to a deflationary spiral because jobs are the primary mechanism for distributing purchasing power to consumers. He has warned that as income becomes ever more concentrated into the hands of a tiny elite, the bulk of consumers will eventually lack the income and confidence to continue supplying demand to the mass market industries that form the backbone of the modern economy. To deal with the rise of unemployment and to ensure that consumers have sufficient purchasing power to continue driving economic prosperity, he is in favor of a basic income guarantee.

Ford strongly supports both capitalism and continued technological progress but believes it will be necessary to adapt our economic system to the new reality created by advances in artificial intelligence, and that some form of basic income guarantee is the best way to do this. In Rise of the Robots he cites the Peltzman effect (or risk compensation) as evidence that the safety net created by a guaranteed income might well result in increased economic risk-taking and a more dynamic and entrepreneurial economy. (Peltzman's thesis that risk-improvement measures may be offset by higher-risk behavior is controversial and has been disputed).

He has also argued for incorporating explicit incentives — especially for pursuing education — into a basic income scheme, suggesting for example that those who graduate from high school (or complete an equivalency exam) ought to receive a somewhat higher guaranteed income than those who drop out. Without this, many marginal or "at risk" students would be presented with a perverse incentive to simply drop out and collect the basic income.

Ford has appeared in a number of documentary films and television features, including The Future of Work and Death, (2016), "Notes on the Way Forward" (2016), CBS News feature "Automation Nation" (2017), "How to Build a Human" (2017) and the HBO documentary The Truth About Killer Robots (2018).

== Awards and honors ==
- 2015 Financial Times and McKinsey Business Book of the Year Award winner for Rise of the Robots

== Books ==
- The Lights in the Tunnel: Automation, Accelerating Technology and the Economy of the Future, Acculant Publishing (2009) ISBN 9781448659814
- Rise of the Robots: Technology and the Threat of a Jobless Future, Basic Books (2015) ISBN 9780465059997
- Rule of the Robots: How Artificial Intelligence Will Transform Everything, Basic Books (2021) ISBN 9781541674738

=== Architects of Intelligence ===
In Architects of Intelligence: The Truth About AI from the People Building It (Packt Publishing, 2018, ISBN 9781789131512), Ford interviewed 23 prominent figures in artificial intelligence, including DeepMind CEO Demis Hassabis, Google's Jeff Dean, and Stanford's Fei-Fei Li. The Verge stated that the book offered a "rare snapshot" of elite opinion in artificial intelligence. Ford stated that his interviewees "don't agree on how fast (AI) is moving, what the next breakthroughs will be, how fast we'll get to (artificial general intelligence), or what the most important risks are." A Vox article on Architects and on John Brockman's Possible Minds states "One gets the sense these are the kinds of books that could perhaps have been written in 1980 about the internet... It is easy for the people involved to see that there’s something enormous here, but surprisingly difficult for them to anticipate which of its potential promises will bear fruit, or when, or whether that will be for the good." The book is mainly composed of transcripts of Ford's interviews.

== Selected publications ==
- Ford, Martin, "Could Artificial Intelligence Create an Unemployment Crisis?", Communications of the ACM, July 2013, Vol. 56 No. 7, Pages 37–39.
- Ford, Martin, "Driverless trucks: economic tsunami may swallow one of most common US jobs", The Guardian, February 16, 2017.
- Ford, Martin, "China’s Troubling Robot Revolution", The New York Times, June 10, 2015.
- Ford, Martin, "Economic Growth Isn't Over, but It Doesn't Create Jobs Like It Used To", Harvard Business Review, March 14, 2016.
- Ford, Martin, "Guess who's coming for your job", CNN, November 10, 2014.
- Ford, Martin, "What if there's no fix for high unemployment?", Fortune, June 10, 2010.
- Ford, Martin, "Your Job In 2020", Forbes, April 8, 2010.
- Ford, Martin, "Dr. Watson: How IBM’s supercomputer could improve health care", The Washington Post, September 16, 2011.
