= The Next Fifty Years =

Collection of scientific essays

The Next Fifty Years: Science in the First Half of the Twenty-First Century
- First edition (US)
- Author: John Brockman
- Language: English
- Genre: Science, Technology, Futurology
- Publisher: Vintage Books (US); Weidenfeld & Nicolson (UK)
- Publication date: 2002
- Publication place: United States
- Media type: Paperback
- ISBN: 0-375-71342-5
- OCLC: 48450819
- Dewey Decimal: 501/.12 21
- LC Class: Q125 .N485 2002

The Next Fifty Years: Science in the First Half of the Twenty-First Century is a 2002 collection of essays by twenty-five well-known scientists, edited by Edge Foundation founder John Brockman, who wrote the introduction.

The essays contain speculation by the authors about the scientific and technological advances that are likely to occur in their various fields in the first half of the 21st century.

The collection is divided into two parts; the twelve essays in Part One are devoted to more theoretical speculation, whereas the thirteen essays in Part Two discuss the possible practical applications of scientific and technological advance.

The contributing scientists are:

- Lee Smolin, The Future of the Nature of the Universe
- Martin Rees, Cosmological Challenges: Are We Alone, and Where?
- Ian Stewart, The Mathematics of 2050
- Brian Goodwin, In the Shadow of Culture
- Marc D. Hauser, Swappable Minds
- Alison Gopnik, What Children Will Teach Scientists
- Paul Bloom, Toward a Theory of Moral Development
- Geoffrey Miller, The Science of Subtlety
- Mihaly Csikszentmihalyi, The Future of Happiness
- Robert M. Sapolsky, Will We Still Be Sad Fifty Years from Now?
- Steven Strogatz, Fermi's "Little Discovery" and the Future of Chaos and Complexity Theory
- Stuart Kauffman, What Is Life?
- Richard Dawkins, Son of Moore's Law
- Paul Davies, Was There a Second Genesis?
- John H. Holland, What Is to Come and How to Predict It?
- Rodney Brooks, The Merger of Flesh and Machines
- Peter Atkins, The Future of Matter
- Roger C. Schank, Are We Going to Get Smarter?
- Jaron Lanier, The Complexity Ceiling
- David Gelernter, Tapping Into the Beam
- Joseph E. LeDoux, Mind, Brain, and Self
- Judith Rich Harris, What Makes Us the Way We Are: The View from 2050
- Samuel Barondes, Drugs, DNA, and the Analyst's Couch
- Nancy Etcoff, Brain Scans, Wearables, and Brief Encounters
- Paul W. Ewald, Mastering Disease
