= Reality Club =

Reality Club may refer to:

- The Reality Club, intellectuals organization based in New York City
- Reality Club (band), Indonesian indie rock band
