= Third culture =

Third culture may refer to:

- Third culture kid, a term for children who have lived a significant portion of their lives in a country other than their native country
- The Third Culture, a 1995 book by John Brockman
