= Edge.org =

Association of science and technology professionals

edge.org
- Website type: Group blog
- Creator: John Brockman
- Website: edge.org

Edge.org is an online magazine exploring scientific and intellectual ideas. Its chief editor is the publisher John Brockman. The website was created in 1997 as an online re-branding of The Reality Club. It is legally established as Edge Foundation, Inc.

In 2019, BuzzFeed News reviewed Edge's IRS filings and reported that Jeffrey Epstein was "by far its largest financial donor", that "his association with Edge gave him access to leading scientists and figures in the tech industry", that he attended at least two Edge dinners in 2011 (two years after he had gone to prison for procuring a minor for prostitution), and that he was not listed by Edge among the attendees of those events.

== The Third Culture ==
Echo markets The Third Culture as a movement towards reintegration of literary and scientific thinking. The name is a nod toward scientist C. P. Snow's concept of the two cultures of science and the humanities. John Brockman published a book of the same name whose themes are continued at the Edge website. Scientists and others are invited to contribute their thoughts in a manner accessible to non-specialist readers.

== Edge Question ==
Edge poses its members an annual question:

- 1998: "What questions are you asking yourself?"
- 1999: "What is the most important invention in the past two thousand years?"
- 2000: "What is today's most important unreported story?"
- 2001: "What questions have disappeared?" and "What now?" This was the only year with two separate questions.
- 2002: "What is your question? ... Why?"
- 2003: "What are the pressing scientific issues for the nation and the world, and what is your advice on how I can begin to deal with them?"
- 2004: "What's your law?"
- 2005: "What do you believe is true even though you cannot prove it?" The responses generated were published as a book under the title What We Believe But Cannot Prove: Today's Leading Thinkers on Science in the Age of Certainty with an introduction by the novelist Ian McEwan.
- 2006: "What is your dangerous idea"? The responses formed the book What Is Your Dangerous Idea?, which was published with an introduction by Steven Pinker and an afterword by Richard Dawkins.
- 2007: "What are you optimistic about? Why?", which resulted in a companion publication.
- 2008: "What have you changed your mind about?" and the corresponding book published shortly thereafter.
- 2009: "What Will Change Everything? What game-changing scientific ideas and developments do you expect to live to see?" and a book version.
- 2010: "How has the Internet changed the way you think?" and associated book.
- 2011: "What Scientific Concept Would Improve Everybody's Cognitive Toolkit?" and associated book.
- 2012: "What is your favorite deep, elegant, or beautiful explanation?" and associated book.
- 2013: "What should we be worried about?" and associated book.
- 2014: "What scientific idea is ready for retirement?" and associated book.
- 2015: "What Do You Think About Machines that Think" and associated book.
- 2016: "What Do You Think the Most Interesting Recent [Scientific] News? What makes it Important?" and associated book.
- 2017: "What scientific term or concept ought to be more widely known?" and associated book.
- 2018: "What is the last-question?"

== Contributing authors ==
As of 2011, contributors included Anthony Aguirre, Stephon Alexander, John Allen Paulos, Adam Alter, Alun Anderson, Ross Anderson, Scott Atran, Mahzarin Banaji, Thomas Bass, Sue Blackmore, Paul Bloom, Giulio Boccaletti, Stefano Boeri, Josh Bongard, Nick Bostrom, Stewart Brand, David Buss, William Calvin, Nicholas Carr, Sean M. Carroll, Nicholas Christakis, George M. Church, Andy Clark, Gregory Cochran, James Croak, Satyajit Das, Richard Dawkins, Aubrey De Grey, Daniel Dennett, Emanuel Derman, Keith Devlin, Rolf Dobelli, George Dyson, David Eagleman, Brian Eno, Juan Enriquez, Dylan Evans, Christine Finn, Stuart Firestein, Helen Fisher, Susan Fiske, Tecumseh Fitch, Richard Foreman, Howard Gardner, Amanda Gefter, David Gelernter, Neil Gershenfeld, Gerd Gigerenzer, Marcelo Gleiser, Nigel Goldenfeld, Rebecca Goldstein, Daniel Goleman, Alison Gopnik, Joshua Greene, Jonathan Haidt, Diane Halpern, Kevin Hand, Haim Harari, Sam Harris, Marti Hearst, Roger Highfield, W. Daniel Hillis, Donald D. Hoffman, Gerald Holton, Bruce Hood, Nicholas Humphrey, Jennifer Jacquet, Xeni Jardin, Daniel Kahneman, Kevin Kelly, Douglas Kenrick, Christian Keysers, Vinod Khosla, Marcel Kinsbourne, Jon Kleinberg, Brian Knutson, Bart Kosko, Kai Krause, Lawrence Krauss, Rob Kurzban, George Lakoff, Jaron Lanier, Jonah Lehrer, Garrett Lisi, Seth Lloyd, Stephen M. Kosslyn, Gary Marcus, Hazel Rose Markus, John McWhorter, Thomas Metzinger, Geoffrey Miller, Evgeny Morozov, P.Z. Myers, David Myers, Richard Nisbett, Tor Norretranders, Hans-Ulrich Obrist, Gloria Origgi, Neri Oxman, Mark Pagel, Greg Paul, Irene Pepperberg, Clifford Pickover, Steven Pinker, David Pizarro, Ernst Pöppel, V.S. Ramachandran, Lisa Randall, Martin Rees, Andrew Revkin, Matt Ridley, Matthew Ritchie, Jay Rosen, Carlo Rovelli, David Rowan, Rudy Rucker, Douglas Rushkoff, Paul Saffo, Scott D. Sampson, Robert Sapolsky, Dimitar Sasselov, Richard Saul Wurman, Roger Schank, Kathryn Schulz, Gino Segre, Charles Seife, Terrence Sejnowski, Martin Seligman, Michael Shermer, Clay Shirky, Lee Smolin, Dan Sperber, Tom Standage, Victoria Stodden, Linda Stone, Nassim Taleb, Don Tapscott, Max Tegmark, Richard Thaler, John Tooby, Eric Topol, J. Craig Venter, Eric Weinstein, Frank Wilczek, Dave Winer and Milford Wolpoff. Carl Zimmer was also a former contributor but asked for his content to be removed after learning of the role of Jeffrey Epstein as a supporter of the foundation.
