= What We Believe but Cannot Prove =

Book by John Brockman

What We Believe But Cannot Prove: Today's Leading Thinkers on Science in the Age of Certainty
- Author: John Brockman
- Language: English
- Publisher: Harper Perennial
- Publication date: February 28, 2006
- Publication place: United States
- Pages: 252
- ISBN: 0-06-084181-8
- OCLC: 64549307
- Dewey Decimal: 500 22
- LC Class: Q173 .W54 2006
- Followed by: What Is Your Dangerous Idea?: Today's Leading Thinkers on the Unthinkable

What We Believe But Cannot Prove: Today's Leading Thinkers on Science in the Age of Certainty is a non-fiction book published by Harper Perennial and edited by literary agent John Brockman that includes an introduction by novelist Ian McEwan. The book consists of responses to a question posed by the Edge Foundation, with answers as short as one sentence and as long as a few pages. Among the 107 published contributors are scientists and philosophers such as Richard Dawkins, Daniel C. Dennett, Jared Diamond, Rebecca Goldstein, Steven Pinker, Sir Martin Rees, and Craig Venter; as well as convicted sex offender Jeffrey Epstein. Some contributions were not included in the print book, including those by Benoit Mandelbrot and computer scientist John McCarthy but are among 120 responses available online.

== Overview ==
Each year, the Edge Foundation poses a question on its website to members of the "third culture", defined by Brockman as "those scientists and other thinkers...who, through their work and expository writing, are taking the place of the traditional intellectual in rendering visible the deeper meanings of our lives, redefining who and what we are".

== Synopsis ==
The essays cover a broad range of topics, including evolution, the workings of the human mind, and science itself. A common focus is the issue of extra-terrestrial life and whether humanity has a supranatural element beyond flesh and blood. Among the more esoteric topics is the question of cockroach consciousness.

A pervasive theme, according to Publishers Weekly, is the discomfort responders felt in professing unproven beliefs, which Publishers Weekly described as "an interesting reflection of the state of science". The question inspired implicit or explicit reflection in a number of responders about the scientific method's reliance on observable, empirical and measurable evidence, with a good many of what The Observer points out as largely American responders defending against "the return to an age of uncertainty in which creationism and intelligent design hold sway in the public mind". "What's really at stake here", Wired said in its review, "is the nature of 'proof' itself".

== Reception ==
What We Believe But Cannot Prove received positive reviews from The Boston Globe, which printed that: "taken as a whole, this little compendium of essays will send you careening from mathematics to economics to the moral progress of the human race, and it is marvelous to watch this muddle of disciplines overlap". The Skeptical Inquirer stated that the book "offers an impressive array of insights and challenges that will surely delight curious readers, generalists, and specialists alike".

Science News and The Guardian described the book respectively as "a tantalizing glimpse into the future of human inquiry" and "[s]scientific pipedreams at their very best". The Daily Telegraph praised the book as "refreshing" and "intriguing and unexpected", noting that "[b]y unleashing scientists from the rigours of the established method we gain fascinating glimpses into the future directions of arcane disciplines few fully understand".

Some reviewers criticized certain aspects of the book, including redundancy and tone. The Observer described the essays as "compelling and repetitive by turns". Publishers Weekly referred to the collection as "stimulating", but found it "unfortunate that the tone of most contributions isn't livelier and that there aren't explanations of some of the more esoteric concepts discussed", limitations which would "keep these adroit musings from finding a wider audience."

== See also ==
- The Third Culture
- What Is Your Dangerous Idea?: Today's Leading Thinkers on the Unthinkable
