= Possible Minds =

2019 science anthology

- First edition
- Editor: John Brockman
- Language: English
- Subject: Artificial intelligence Futurism
- Published: 2019
- Publisher: Penguin Press
- Publication place: United States
- Media type: Hardcover
- Pages: 293
- ISBN: 9780525557999

Possible Minds: Twenty-five Ways of Looking at AI, edited by John Brockman, is a 2019 collection of essays on the future impact of artificial intelligence.

== Structure ==
Twenty-five essayists contributed essays related to artificial intelligence (AI) pioneer Norbert Wiener's 1950 book The Human Use of Human Beings, in which Weiner, fearing future machines built from vacuum tubes and capable of sophisticated logic, warned that "The hour is very late, and the choice of good and evil knocks at our door. We must cease to kiss the whip that lashes us." Wiener stated that an AI "which can learn and can make decisions on the basis of its learning, will in no way be obliged to make such decisions as we should have made, or will be acceptable to us". The essayists seek to address the question: What dangers might advanced AI present to humankind? Prominent essayists include Daniel Dennett, Alison Gopnik, Jaan Tallinn, and George Dyson. Brockman interleaves his own intros and anecdotes between the contributors' essays.

== Ideas ==
Multiple essayists state that artificial general intelligence is still two to four decades away. Most of the essayists advice proceeding with caution. Hypothetical dangers discussed include societal fragmentation, loss of human jobs, dominance of multinational corporations with powerful AI, or existential risk if superintelligent machines develop a drive for self-preservation. Computer scientist W. Daniel Hillis states "Humans might be seen as minor annoyances, like ants at a picnic". Some essayists argue that AI has already become an integral part of human culture; geneticist George M. Church suggests that modern human are already "transhumans" when compared with humans in the Stone Age. Many of the essays are influenced by past failures of AI. MIT's Neil Gershenfeld states "Discussions about artificial intelligence have been (manic-depressive): depending on how you count, we're now in the fifth boom-and-bust cycle." Brockman states "over the decades I rode with (the AI pioneers) on waves of enthusiasm, and into valleys of disappointment". Many essayists emphasize the limitations of past and current AI; Church notes that 2011 Jeopardy! champion Watson required 85,000 watts of power, compared to a human brain which uses 20 watts.

== Reception ==
Kirkus Reviews stated readers who want to ponder the future impact of AI "will not find a better introduction than this book." Publishers Weekly called the book "enlightening, entertaining, and exciting reading". Future Perfect (Vox) wrote about Possible Minds and Architects of Intelligence that "both books make for gripping reading". Booklist stated the book includes "many rich ideas" to "savor and contemplate". In Foreign Affairs, technology journalist Kenneth Cukier called the book "a fascinating map".
