= Giulio Boccaletti =

British-Italian scientist and author

Giulio Boccaletti (born in Modena, Italy) is a British-Italian scientist and author. He has been an Honorary Research Associate at the Smith School of Enterprise and the Environment. He has been the Chief Strategy Officer and Global Managing Director for Water at The Nature Conservancy and was a partner of consulting firm McKinsey & Company. Trained as a physicist and atmospheric scientist, Boccaletti has been a member of the World Economic Forum’s Global Agenda Council, and has served on the OECD-WWC High Level Panel on Infrastructure Financing for a Water-Secure World. He is the Scientific Director of the Euro-Mediterranean Center on Climate Change and a member of the editorial advisory board of the journal Water Security.

An alumnus of MIT, Princeton and Bologna universities, Boccaletti was briefly a lead author of the fifth Assessment Report of the Intergovernmental Panel on Climate Change (IPCC) and has contributed to the ideas platform published by the Edge Foundation, Inc. He was featured in the PBS series "H2O: The Molecule that Made Us". His book "Water: A Biography", a history of how the distribution of water has shaped human civilisation, is published by Pantheon Books.

== Career ==
=== The Nature Conservancy ===
Boccaletti joined The Nature Conservancy (TNC) in February 2013. In his role as Chief Strategy Officer, he worked with other members of the Executive Team to develop the organization's strategy and apply economic and scientific practice to its conservation agenda. Likewise, as the organization's Global Managing Director for Water, Boccaletti led a team of over 200 freshwater scientists, policy experts, economists and on-the-ground conservation practitioners, promoting action on water issues by governments and businesses.

- Hydropower: Boccaletti has argued that if dams are better located, the same hydropower capacity could be built without damaging rivers to the same extent. In 2015, TNC published a report on this called the Power of Rivers.
- Water funds: Boccaletti has also argued in favour of water funds as a means of financing the $10 trillion funding gap for water. These should include investments in natural infrastructure, he has written, and that investments in upstream nature conservation could improve water quality in a quarter of cities worldwide. After the launch of Africa's first water fund, Boccaletti said “If we get it right, natural infrastructure may be the same story as mobile phones in Africa.”
- Climate bonds: In October 2015, Boccaletti called into question whether climate bonds are sufficiently transparent on sustainability.
- Sustainable Development Goals: Boccaletti has been a vocal proponent of the centrality of water access and security in dealing with other social issues such as public health.

=== McKinsey ===
In 2005 Boccaletti joined McKinsey & Company where he became a partner. He co-founded the water practice and worked with businesses and governments all over the world. He co-authored the “Charting Our Water Future” report, one of the first to address the question of global water scarcity through multilateral, private-public collaboration defining a cost-curve for investment in water infrastructure.

=== MIT ===
In September 2003 Boccaletti joined the Department of Earth Atmospheric and Planetary Sciences at the Massachusetts Institute of Technology, where he specialized in geophysical fluid dynamics and climate science. His research focused on the dynamics of large-scale oceanic flows. Boccaletti, G.; Ferrari, R.; Adcroft, A.; Ferreira, D.; Marshall, J. (2005). "The vertical structure of ocean heat transport". Geophysical Research Letters. 32 (10). MIT: L10603. Bibcode:2005GeoRL..3210603B. doi:10.1029/2005GL022474.

=== Early academic career ===
Boccaletti holds an MSc in Theoretical Physics from the Università di Bologna, Italy, and an MA and PhD in Atmospheric and Oceanic Sciences from Princeton University. He also investigated the theory of the General Circulation of the Atmosphere at Italy's National Research Council (Italy).

== Other interests ==
Boccaletti is an acknowledged expert of the Italian musical instrument known as the Ocarina, an ancient type of wind instrument, with a history dating back some 12,000 years. A member of the Gruppo Ocarinistico Budriese, Boccaletti has played professionally both in groups and solo since 1983.

== Awards ==
- Young Global Leader, World Economic Forum, 2014
- Geophysical Fluid Dynamics Fellow, Woods Hole Oceanographic Institution, 2000

== Research and publications ==
- Boccaletti, G.; Ferrari, R.; Fox-Kemper, R. (2007). "Mixed Layer Instabilities and Restratification" (PDF). Journal of Physical Oceanography. 37 (9): 2228–2250. Bibcode:2007JPO....37.2228B. doi:10.1175/JPO3101.1.
- "Stationarity" chapter in "This Idea Must Die", HarperCollins, 2014
- "The complex, consequential, not-so-easy decisions about our water resources" chapter in "What should we be worried about”, Harper, 2013
- "New Economic Frameworks for Decision Making" in "Water Security: the water-food-energy-climate nexus", The World Economic Forum Water Initiative, 2011, Island Press
- "Confronting South Africa's Water Challenge", 2010, McKinsey Quarterly
- "The Business Opportunity in Water Conservation", 2009, McKinsey Quarterly
- "Charting our Water Future - Economic Frameworks for Decision Making", 2009, WRG report
- "How IT can cut carbon emissions", 2008, McKinsey Quarterly
- "Smart 2020 - Enabling the low carbon economy in the information age", 2008, GeSI - The Climate Group
- "Climate Change: Everyone's business", 2007, CBI Climate Change Task Force
- Boccaletti, G.; Ferrari, R.; Adcroft, A.; Ferreira, D.; Marshall, J. (2005). "The Vertical Structure of Ocean Heat transport" (PDF). Geophysical Research Letters. 32 (10): 2228. Bibcode:2005GeoRL..3210603B. doi:10.1029/2005GL022474.
- Boccaletti, G.; Ferrari, R. (2004). "Eddy-Mixed Layer Interactions in the Ocean" (PDF). Oceanography. 17 (3): 12–21. doi:10.5670/oceanog.2004.26.
- Fedorov, A.; Barreiro, M.; Boccaletti, G.; Pacanowski, R.; Philander, S.G. (2007). "The freshening of surface waters in high latitudes: effects on the thermohaline and wind-driven circulations". Journal of Physical Oceanography. 37 (4): 896–907. Bibcode:2007JPO....37..896F. doi:10.1175/JPO3033.1.
