= The Hedgehog and the Fox =

1953 book by Isaiah Berlin

The Hedgehog and the Fox: An Essay on Tolstoy's View of History
- First edition
- Author: Isaiah Berlin
- Language: English
- Publisher: Weidenfeld & Nicolson
- Publication date: 1953
- Publication place: UK
- Pages: 86

The Hedgehog and the Fox is an essay by philosopher Isaiah Berlin that was published as a book in 1953. It was one of his most popular essays with the public. However, Berlin said, "I meant it as a kind of enjoyable intellectual game, but it was taken seriously. Every classification throws light on something". It has been compared to "an intellectual's cocktail-party game".

== Summary ==
The title is a reference to a fragment attributed to the Ancient Greek poet Archilochus: πόλλ' οἶδ' ἀλώπηξ, ἀλλ' ἐχῖνος ἓν μέγα ("a fox knows many things, but a hedgehog knows one big thing"). In Erasmus's Adagia from 1500, the expression is recorded as Multa novit vulpes, verum echinus unum magnum. (The fable of The Fox and the Cat embodies the same idea.)

Berlin expands upon this idea to divide writers and thinkers into two categories: hedgehogs, who view the world through the lens of a single defining idea (examples given include Plato, Lucretius, Blaise Pascal, Marcel Proust and Fernand Braudel), and foxes, who draw on a wide variety of experiences and for whom the world cannot be boiled down to a single idea (examples given include Aristotle, Desiderius Erasmus, Johann Wolfgang Goethe).

Turning to Leo Tolstoy, Berlin contends that at first glance, Tolstoy escapes definition into one of the two groups. He postulates that while Tolstoy's talents are those of a fox, his beliefs are that one ought to be a hedgehog and so Tolstoy's own voluminous assessments of his own work are misleading. Berlin goes on to use this idea of Tolstoy as a basis for an analysis of the theory of history that Tolstoy presents in his novel War and Peace.

In the latter half of the essay, Berlin compares Tolstoy with the early 19th-century thinker Joseph de Maistre. As Berlin explains, while Tolstoy and de Maistre held violently contrasting views on more superficial matters, they also held profoundly similar views about the fundamental nature of existence and the limits of a rational scientific approach to it.

The essay ends with Berlin reiterating his view of Tolstoy—by nature a fox, but a hedgehog by conviction—by concluding that this duality caused Tolstoy great pain at the end of his life.

== Influence ==
=== In business and forecasting ===
James C. Collins refers to the story in his 2001 book Good to Great: Why Some Companies Make the Leap... and Others Don't , where he clearly shows his preference towards hedgehog mentality.

Philip E. Tetlock, a political psychology professor at the University of Pennsylvania, drew heavily on this distinction in his exploration of the accuracy of experts and forecasters in various fields (especially politics) in his 2005 book Expert Political Judgment: How Good Is It? How Can We Know? Tetlock summarized substantial research claiming that most experts and well-paid pundits think like hedgehogs with one big idea; on average they make poor forecasts. Meanwhile, people who draw information from a large variety of often-conflicted sources, like foxes, make better forecasts. However, both are often beaten by formal models like autoregressive distributed lag models.

In his 2012 The New York Times bestselling book The Signal and the Noise, forecaster Nate Silver urges readers to be "more foxy" after summarising Berlin's distinction. He cites the work of Philip E. Tetlock on the accuracy of political forecasts in the United States during the Cold War while he was a professor of political science at the University of California, Berkeley. Silver's news website, FiveThirtyEight, when it was launched in March 2014, also adopted the fox as its logo "as an allusion to" Archilochus' original work.

In 2018, the author John Lewis Gaddis refers to Berlin's essay as well as Tetlock's work in his 2018 book On Grand Strategy.

=== In other disciplines ===
Some authors such as Michael Walzer have used the same pattern of description for Berlin himself, as a person who knows many things, compared to the purported narrowness of many other contemporary political philosophers. Berlin's former student, Canadian philosopher Charles Taylor, was dubbed a hedgehog by Berlin and admitted to it after receiving the 2007 Templeton Prize.

Legal philosopher Ronald Dworkin's 2011 book, Justice for Hedgehogs, argues the case for a single, overarching, and coherent framework of moral truth.

Music historian Berthold Hoeckner applies and extends Berlin's distinction in his 2007 essay "Wagner and the Origin of Evil". One of Hoeckner's key insights is that the historiography of Wagner's antisemitism, much like that of the Holocaust, has two main branches: a hedgehog-like functionalist branch that sees the composer's polemic jabs at Jewish culture as mere assimilationist rhetoric, and a fox-like intentionalist branch that sees them instead as violent expressions of genuinely eliminationist Judenhass.

In his book Wittgenstein's Place in Twentieth-Century Analytic Philosophy, Oxford philosopher Peter Hacker uses this metaphor to contrast Berlin's Tolstoy (a fox who wants to be a hedgehog) with philosopher Ludwig Wittgenstein, who was "by nature a hedgehog, but after 1929 transformed himself, by great intellectual and imaginative endeavour, into a paradigmatic fox".

Claudio Véliz uses Berlin's construction to contrast Anglo-American and Spanish patterns of settlement and governance in his 1994 book The New World of the Gothic Fox: Culture and Economy in English and Spanish America.

Peter Kivy refers to the essay when describing philosophy of art in the current day as the age of the fox (best represented by Noël Carroll), contrasting it with the previous era of the hedgehog (best represented by Arthur Danto).

Harvard political economist Dani Rodrik applies the distinction to "hedgehog" mainstream orthodox economists who apply the "Liberal Paradigm" to everything everywhere always and "fox" heterodox (political) economists who have different answers to different times, places, and situations in his 2015 book Economics Rules: The Rights and Wrongs of the Dismal Science.

Leading Judge, Lord Hoffmann, observed that "Copyright law protects foxes better than hedgehogs" in his Judgment in the case Designers Guild Ltd v Russell Williams (Textiles) Ltd in the UK House of Lords.

Linguist Mark Aronoff divides linguists into these two groups, essentially those that emphasize linguistic theory versus those focused on empirical accuracy and generalizations. He identifies as a fox and states, "I find it hard to understand why hedgehogs make the moves that they make. It has always been especially puzzling to me why they react with such vehemence to what strikes me, a fox, as entirely reasonable or even unremarkable."

In an interview with Brady Haran, mathematician Terence Tao referred to the essay and identified himself as a "fox" due to his ability to shift between and reconcile disparate mathematical fields by using analogies.

== In popular culture ==
- In Woody Allen's 1992 film Husbands and Wives, Judy Davis's character Sally muses while having sex about whether people she knows are hedgehogs or foxes.
- Rock band Luna's 1995 album Penthouse contains a song called "Hedgehog", which asks "Are you a fox or a hedgehog"
- A Richard Serra sculpture called "The Hedgehog and the Fox" was installed at Princeton University in 2000.

== Hedgehogs and foxes ==
=== Hedgehogs ===
Name	Classified by	Notes
Plato	Isaiah Berlin	In the original essay
Dante Alighieri	Isaiah Berlin	In the original essay
Friedrich Nietzsche	Isaiah Berlin	In the original essay
Fyodor Dostoyevsky	Isaiah Berlin	In the original essay
Abraham Lincoln	John Lewis Gaddis	A hedgehog who used foxy means
Carl E. Reichardt	James C. Collins	"stripped everything down to its essential simplicity"
Miles Davis	Gary Giddins	"a born hedgehog who believes in being a fox"
Wendy's	Tom Gara	"it doubled down on its core burger lineup"
Karl Marx	Isaiah Berlin	In the original essay
Ayn Rand	Charles Murray	
Napoleon	John Lewis Gaddis	
Winston Churchill	Philip Tetlock	"not a man who let contradictory information interfere with his idées fixes"
René Girard	Roberto Calasso	
George Washington	Joseph Ellis	"the one big thing he knew was that America's future as a nation lay to the West"
John Dewey	Richard Rorty	
Bernie Sanders	Harold Meyerson	
Thomas Edison	Thomas P. Hughes	

=== Foxes ===
Name	Classified by	Notes
Shakespeare	Isaiah Berlin	In the original essay
Aristotle	Isaiah Berlin	In the original essay
James Joyce	Isaiah Berlin	In the original essay
Leo Tolstoy	Isaiah Berlin	In the original essay ("a fox who all his life sought, unsuccessfully, to be a hedgehog")
FiveThirtyEight	Nate Silver	Its logo is a fox, alluding to Archilochus' saying
Warren Buffett	William Thorndike	
Sigmund Freud	Peter Gay	"a fox who at times affected a hedgehog's clothing"
McDonald's	Tom Gara	"firing multiple shots in all directions"
Pauli Murray	Peter Salovey	
Grace Hopper	Peter Salovey	
Benjamin Franklin	Peter Salovey	
Hillary Clinton	Harold Meyerson	"much more comfortable addressing a wide range of topics"
Terence Tao	Himself	"I identify mostly as a fox"

== Publication ==
In addition to the essay's 1953 publication as a book, it has been published as part of a 2008 collection of Berlin's writings, Russian Thinkers, edited by Henry Hardy and Aileen Kelly. The essay also appears in a 2000 anthology of Berlin's writings, The Proper Study of Mankind: An Anthology of Essays.

== See also ==
- Conceptual framework
- Foxes in popular culture, films and literature
- Hedgehogs in culture
- Homo unius libri, similar sentiment
- Lumpers and splitters
- Gould, Stephen Jay, The Hedgehog, the Fox, and the Magister's Pox
