= Euro-Mediterranean Center on Climate Change =

Italian climate research centre

CMCC
- Euro-Mediterranean Center on Climate Change
- Centro Euro-Mediterraneo sui Cambiamenti Climatici
- Formation: 2005; 21 years ago
- Type: Nonprofit
- Legal status: foundation
- Purpose: Climate science
- Headquarters: Lecce
- Website: cmcc.it

The Euro-Mediterranean Center on Climate Change (CMCC) is a research center which models and predicts the interaction between climate change and social, economic and environmental changes. The CMCC is a foundation based in Italy and carries out international research projects funded through programmes supported by the European Union as well as by national and international funding bodies.

== History ==
The CMCC started its operations in 2005. In 2008, it opened its High Performance Computing Center and by the 2020s machine learning and artificial intelligence were increasingly being used. In 2015, the center became a foundation. In 2018, a new partnership with Resources for the Future was established: the RFF-CMCC European Institute on Economics and the Environment (EIEE), based in Milan.

== Organization ==
The CMCC Foundation headquarters are located in Lecce, with local offices in Bologna, Venice, Caserta, Sassari, Viterbo and Milan. The president of CMCC is Dr. Antonio Navarra. The operations director is Laura Panzera. The scientific director is Giulio Boccaletti.

The foundation's research is organized into three institutes that bring together climate sciences experts from various countries in a multidisciplinary environment. Collaboration among these institutes facilitates cross-disciplinary work on multiple aspects of climate change, including its social and economic impacts and technological dimensions.

The three research institutes are:

- Institute for Earth System Prediction (IESP)
- Institute for Climate Resilience (ICR)
- European Institute on Economics and the Environment (EIEE)

In addition to its institutes, the CMCC Foundation carries out cross-disciplinary research through several strategic programs:

- Integration of the planetary biogeochemical and industrial carbon cycles
- Predicting socio-economic outcomes in a changing climate
- Global coasts as a new frontier
- Integrating artificial intelligence and machine learning in the modeling chain

CMCC also operates three specialized centers that expand its research capacity, enhance computational resources, and support innovation and training:

- High Performance Computing Center (HPCC)
- Advanced Digital Innovation Center (ADIC)
- Advanced Training and Education Center (ATEC)

== Co-founders ==
CMCC was co-founded by

- Italian National Institute of Geophysics and Volcanology
- University of Salento
- Ca' Foscari University of Venice
- University of Sassari
- Tuscia University
- Polytechnic University of Milan
- Resources for the Future
- University of Bologna

== Mission and scope ==
The CMCC models the effects of climate change on people, nature and the economy. Through advanced climate modeling, it build tools to help decision-makers in planning both short-term responses and long-term strategies for climate resilience.

The Foundation delivers scientific-technical products and technical support to ministries, regions and provinces, and the private sector.

CMCC participates in multiple European projects and works on several international initiatives such as Copernicus Services, the European Topic Centre on Climate Change impacts, vulnerability, and Adaptation, ICOS, JPI Climate, and the UN Global Compact, among others.

It also hosts the Intergovernmental Panel on Climate Change (IPCC) National Focal Point for Italy.
