= Rise of the Robots (book) =

2015 book by Martin Ford

Rise of the Robots: Technology and the Threat of a Jobless Future
- First edition
- Author: Martin Ford
- Language: English
- Subject: Futurology
- Genre: Non-fiction
- Publisher: Basic Books
- Publication date: 2015
- Publication place: United States
- ISBN: 978-0465059997

Rise of the Robots: Technology and the Threat of a Jobless Future is a 2015 book by American futurist Martin Ford. What are the jobs of the future? How many will there be? And who will have them? As technology continues to accelerate and machines begin taking care of themselves, fewer people will be necessary. Artificial intelligence is already well on its way to making "good jobs" obsolete: many paralegals, journalists, office workers, and even computer programmers are poised to be replaced by robots and smart software. As progress continues, blue and white collar jobs alike will evaporate, squeezing working -- and middle-class families ever further. At the same time, households are under assault from exploding costs, especially from the two major industries-education and health care-that, so far, have not been transformed by information technology. The result could well be massive unemployment and inequality as well as the implosion of the consumer economy itself.

== Thesis ==
While technological advances in the previous century mainly displaced more uneducated laborers, the 21st century is seeing technology increasingly threatening skilled workers' jobs as well. Lawyers, radiologists and software designers have seen their work outsourced to the developing world. Ford believes that unlike previous centuries, the current emerging technologies will fail to generate new forms of employment; he predicts that new industries will "rarely, if ever, be highly labor-intensive". Companies like YouTube and Instagram are based on "tiny workforces and huge valuations and revenues". Ford downplays the benefits of expanding education ("The problem is that the skills ladder is not really a ladder at all: it is a pyramid, and there is only so much room at the top"), and argues for a "dramatic policy response" such as a guaranteed basic income.

Many economists disagree with Ford's thesis that the IT revolution is fundamentally different from previous technological revolutions. Libertarian economist Robin Hanson argues that the recent ominous labor trends may have causes other than automation, such as "demographics, regulation, worker values, organization practices, and other technologies".

== Reception ==
The book was praised for lucidly arguing its bleak viewpoint. Reviewing Rise in the New York Times, Barbara Ehrenreich stated "The human consequences of robotization are already upon us, and skillfully chronicled here". A review in the Los Angeles Times stated that Rise was "Lucid, comprehensive and unafraid to grapple fairly with those who dispute Ford's basic thesis", and "better than 'Lights in the Tunnel'", Ford's previous book on the same topic. The Guardian's review points out the book gets more speculative as it goes on, and states: "Although it may be difficult to overstate the dangers posed by the new technology", Rise may have managed to do so, but is regardless well worth reading. The "Dot Physics" column in Wired stated "It's sort of depressing to think about the future in cases where robots dominate. Overall, the book was well written with interesting stories about both business and technology." Financial Times chief US commentator Edward Luce called Rise "well researched and disturbingly persuasive".

Rise was awarded the £30,000 Financial Times and McKinsey Business Book of the Year Award of 2015.
