= James Croak =

- Born: 1951 (age 74–75)
- Education: University of Illinois
- Known for: conceptual configuration and sculpture

James Croak (born 1951) is a visual artist known for his work in conceptual figuration and sculpture.

== Early years ==
James Croak was born in Cleveland, Ohio in 1951. His mother died at the age of two. At the age of 15 he was a recognized musical prodigy and studied under Andrés Segovia, the virtuoso Spanish classical guitarist. At the age of sixteen he gave a series of concerts as a part of the 1968 Summer Olympic Games in Mexico City. Following his high school education, Croak attended the Ecumenical Institute in Chicago studying philosophy, and studied sculpture concurrently at the University of Illinois at Chicago graduating in 1974.

== Professional life ==
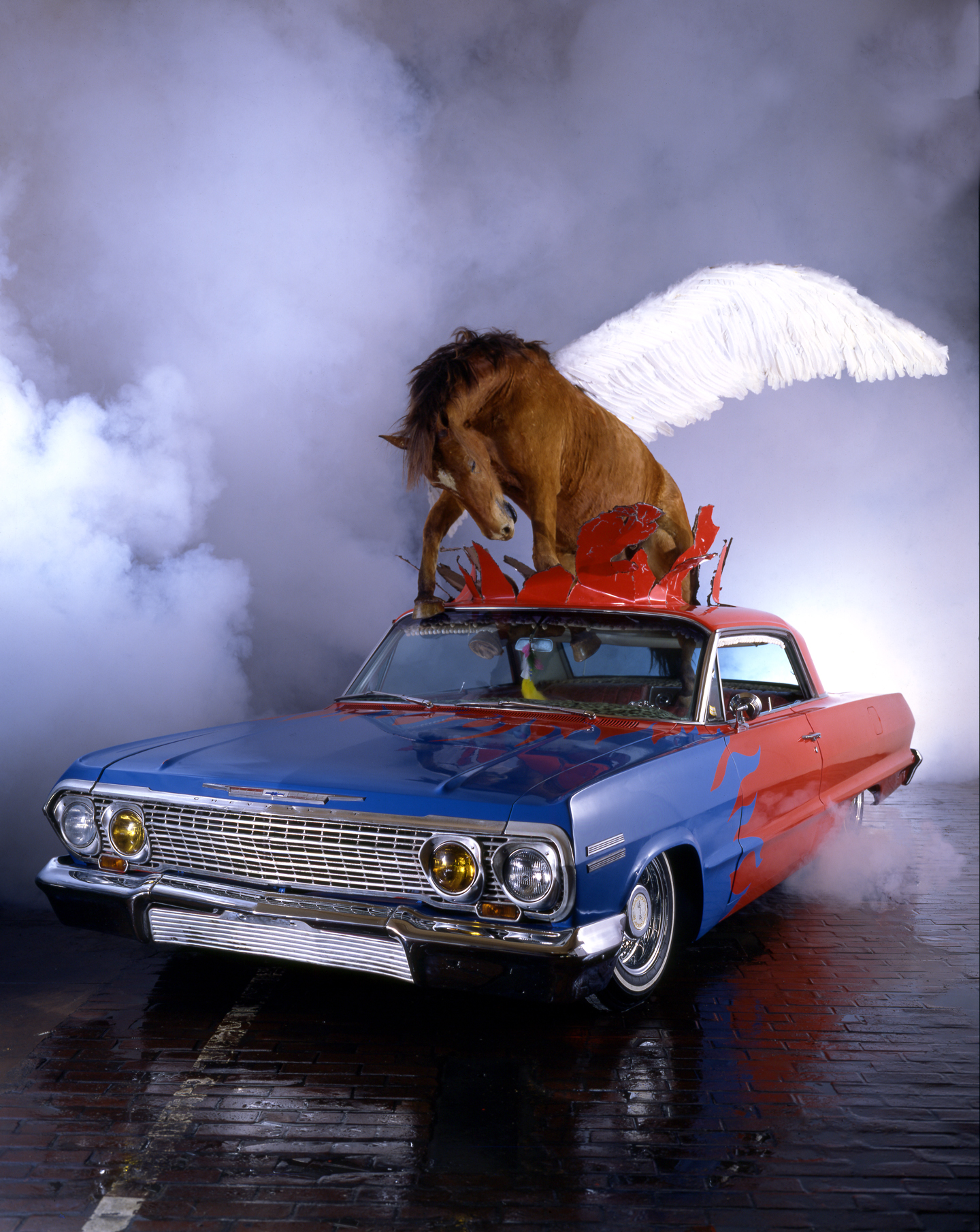
James Croak's Pegasus Some Loves, an example of his combination of taxidermy and found objects, was created in 1983.

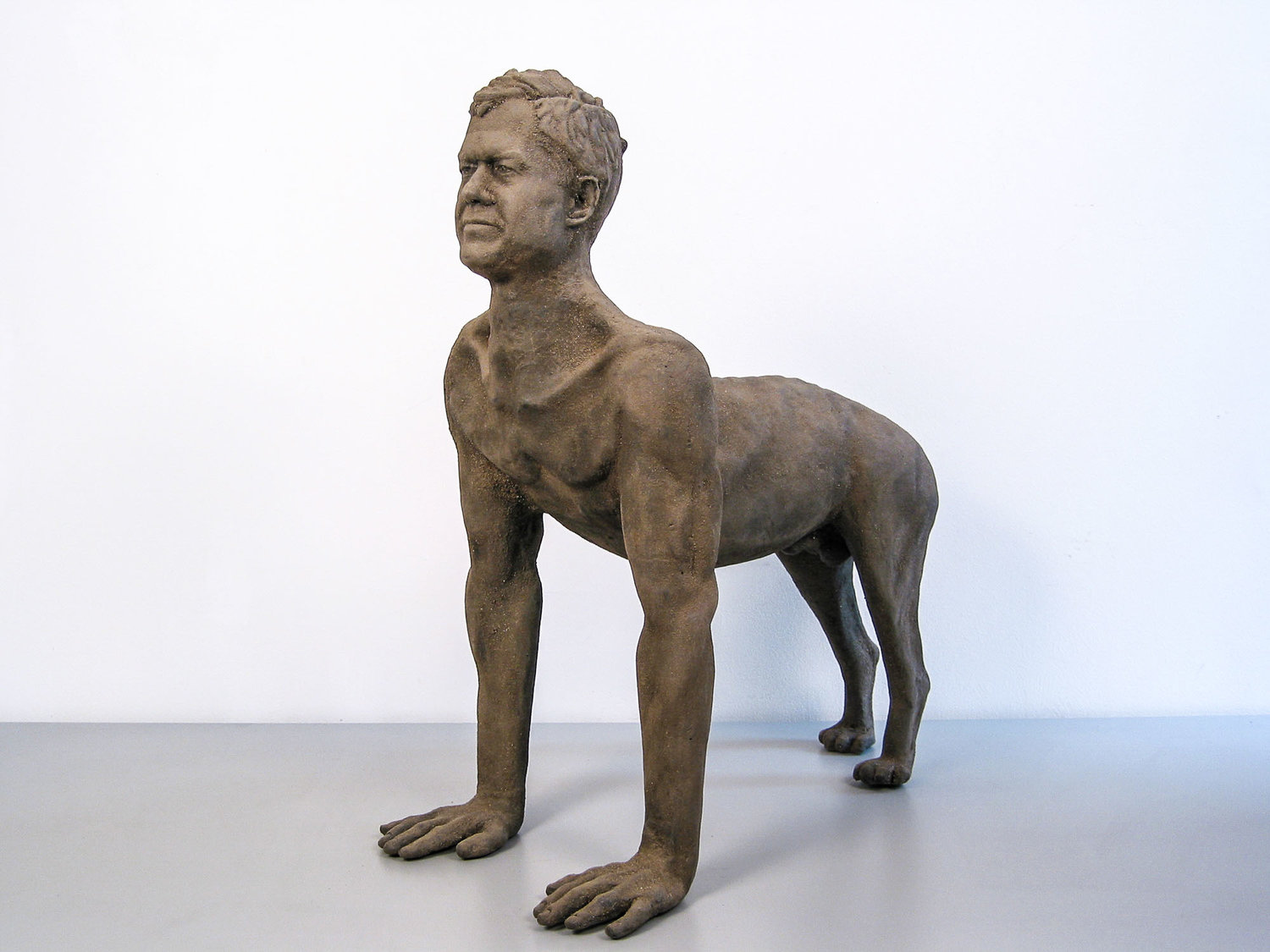
James Croak's Study for the Beast, an example of his dirt sculpture, was created in 1987.

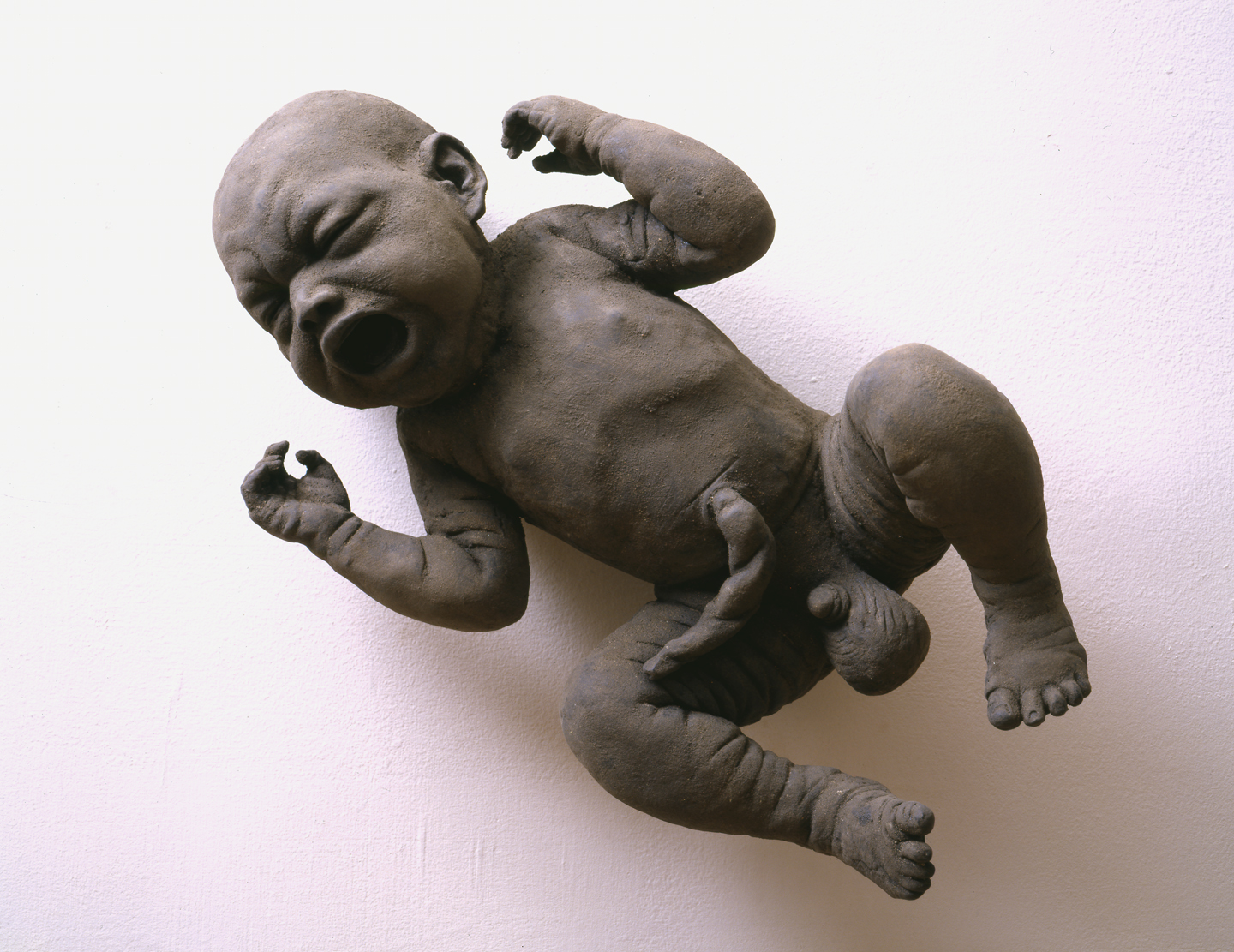
James Croak's Dirt Baby, an example of his dirt sculpture, was created in 2000.

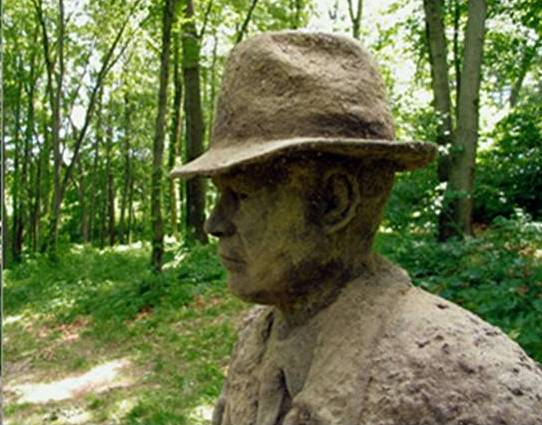
James Croak's Dirt Man with Shovel, an example of his dirt sculpture, was created in 1996.

Croak received a National Endowment for the Arts artist-in-residence grant in 1976. At this point much of his work was done with the medium of aluminum in a method similar to that of Frank Stella, although Croak is believed to have developed his personal technique himself. Later that year he moved his work to the abandoned Fire Station Number 23 in Los Angeles, California, where his work became less abstract and more figural. After eight years he moved to Brooklyn, New York.

Croak's work was featured in Thomas C. McEvilley's book Sculpture in the Age of Doubt, and also in a book dedicated entirely to Croak's work entitled James Croak, published by the same author. In 2011 he was featured at the Wellcome Collection in London, UK as a part of an exhibition entitled "Dirt". The work exhibited was designed to cause a strong emotional reaction in the onlooker: a review of his work at this show by The Guardian newspaper's art critic Laura Cumming stated that, "It would be hard to overstate the physical effect of James Croak's… sculpture". The sculpture was an example of his "dirt sculpture" technique, which employs a mixture of binder and different kinds of dirt, dust, and soil. According to the artist, the material was developed out of necessity, stating that in 1985, "I wanted to cast a full-size self–portrait, but I couldn't afford bronze, so I walked down the street to an empty lot, dug up dirt, put it in a wheelbarrow, took it home, mixed it with glue, and pressed it into the plaster mold." He has also been known to work with found objects and taxidermy. A twenty-year retrospective of his work was held in 1998 at the Contemporary Art Center of Virginia.

The transition from aluminum to dirt as a medium gave his work a harder and rougher feel than his prior works. In each medium Croak has designed his works in a series. Some examples of his series include the Dirt Man series, the Dirt Baby series, and the Dirt Window series. Croak is also a published writer, with essays appearing in the books This Will Make You Smarter: New Scientific Concepts to Improve Your Thinking and Is the Internet Changing the Way you Think?: The Net's Impact on our Minds and Future, both edited by John Brockman. An additional essay was published in the book Afterwords, a compilation put together by Salon.com featuring the works of its contributors, which Croak has been one on occasion. He is also an online contributor and conference participant to the non-profit intellectual organization Edge.org, the membership of which is composed of highly accomplished thinkers in both the arts and sciences from different corners of the world. His works are also available at the website Artnet. According to art critic Carlos Suarez de Jesus, themes involved in Croak's work often include death, social instability, and the finite nature of human life. Another recurring theme in his work is ancient mythology. Mr. Croak's essays and art work now appear in over 32 books. In addition, James Croak is an avid pilot and has an American commercial pilot license.

== Dirt sculpture ==
Croak's dirt sculpture technique goes as follows. First a model is selected and photographed from many different angles. The photograph is then dressed with a grid in order to allow for accurate size referencing. Second, an armature is created from steel and aluminum that is strong enough to support two hundred pounds of clay. Third, the clay is sculpted in the presence of the model over the span of more than one hundred hours in order to replicate the model's body as precisely as possible. Fourth, smaller and more minute details like the face are refined. Fifth, the sculpture is then cut into pieces and a two layer mold (a rubber layer and a plaster layer) is made from those pieces. Sixth, Croak digs up or acquires a large amount of dirt and dries it with the aid of large fans. Seventh, Croak mixes the dirt with a binder, then pours the mixture into the mold. Eighth, once set, the pieces of the sculpture are then reassembled and glued together with the same dirt and binder mixture with which they were created. His dirt sculptures have appeared in over twenty-five published books.
