= The Hedgehog and the Fox (sculpture) =

Sculpture by Richard Serra

Coordinates: 40.346433°N 74.6525569°W

- The Hedgehog and the Fox with the Princeton University football stadium in the background
- Artist: Richard Serra
- Year: 1999
- Type: weathering steel
- Dimensions: 457.0 cm × 286.5 cm (179.9 in × 112.8 in)
- Location: Princeton University Art Museum; Princeton, New Jersey
- Owner: Princeton University

The Hedgehog and the Fox is a late Minimalist sculpture of Richard Serra, installed between Peyton and Fine halls and the football stadium at Princeton University in 2000. It was commissioned for the university by Princeton graduate Peter Joseph in honour of his children some years before his death in 1998.

== The sculpture and its meaning ==
The sculpture consists of three serpentine sheets of steel standing 94 feet long and 15 feet high, each comprising two identical conical/elliptical sections, inverted relative to each other overall. The steel plates are 2 inches thick and the piece, as often in Serra's work, adapts itself to its environment. It is closely related to other outdoor installations such as the double ribbons of Sidewinder (1999), on the lawn adjacent to the curving drives at Leonard Riggio’s home in Bridgehampton, New York, and the single ribbon following the contour line of “Contour 290” (Glenstone, 2004). An earlier example is the larger but structurally similar Snake (1996) at the Guggenheim Museum Bilbao and the Double Torqued Ellipse of 1997. However, although the ribbon sculptures relate to Serra's Torqued Ellipse series of this period, their openness also contrasts with the small private spaces carved out of the large public sites where the sculptures of that series are installed.

The title of The Hedgehog and the Fox refers to an essay of that name by Isaiah Berlin, where he quotes a line from the Greek poet Archilochus: "The fox knows many things but the hedgehog knows one great thing." Serra has explained that "It points to how scholars either become free thinkers and invent or become subjugated to the dictates of history. This is the classical problem posed to every student." Harold Foster, a professor in Princeton's art and archaeology department, has further commented upon it that "There are those who follow one principle in all they do — the hedgehogs — and those who look to different approaches at the same time — the foxes. The suggestion is that students might negotiate a balance between these two ways." Viewers are therefore invited to engage with the sculpture by walking through its twisting structure and so enact that intellectual journey. Serra further emphasised his thinking in the interview he gave before delivering a lecture on his work at Princeton as Belknap Visitor in the Humanities in 2001. "The experience of the subject is the piece itself. Without the interaction, there is no piece."

That statement fits within the wider intention behind Serra's work. In a lecture given at Yale University in 1990, he declared that his sculptures are meant to "become part of the site and restructure both conceptually and perceptually the organization of the site". He further underlined this in his speech at the dedication of "The Fox and the Hedgehog" at Princeton. "It seems to be that one of the basic functions of art is to enable us to acknowledge thought and perception in ways that other things do not. To engage thought does not mean that the thought is contained solely within the work itself, it also means that the thought is contained within the dialogue that the work engenders in relation to its place."

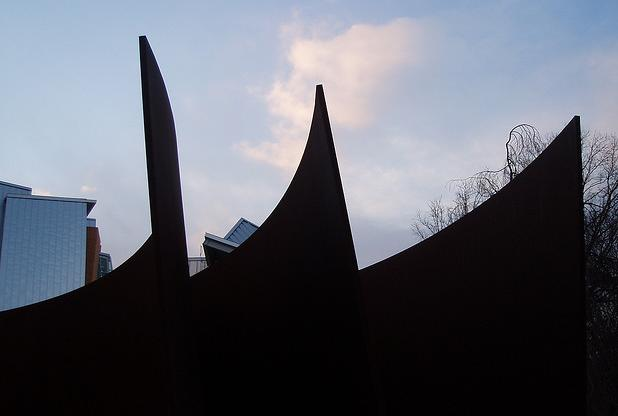
The Hedgehog and the Fox with roof features of the Lewis Science Library above its upper edges

In the case of The Hedgehog and the Fox, the steel sheets are hosed down in order to enhance the reddish-brown rust on the steel ribbons and suggest the colour of the fox. The fluid sinuosity of their movement adapts itself to the curves of the football stadium in the background, so as to create a visual continuum. Fortuitously, the upper edges of the sheets are now echoed by the gables and edges of the nearby Lewis Science Library, completed later in 2008, producing the prickly effect of a hedgehog curled up in defence.

For all its seeming abstraction, the sculpture has a personal significance for Serra himself. His interest in steel as an art medium began when he was a young man working in Californian steel mills to finance his education. Another powerful influence was the San Francisco shipyard where his father worked as a pipe-fitter. Serra has said that "All the raw material that I needed is contained in the reserve of this memory which has become a reoccurring dream." As in the proletarian workspace of the shipyard, his creations are shifted from the pedestal and allow an interaction between the work and the viewer. His reading of the line by Archilochus therefore reverses the moral order of the original fable of The Hedgehog and the Fox. The hedgehog, insisting on a patrician exclusive culture, is intellectually dead; the fox's adaptability (demonstrated by this sculpture's relationship to its environment) is the correct strategy for intellectual progress.
