= The Reality Club =

Club in New York City

The Reality Club was a group of mostly New York City-based intellectuals that met regularly from 1981 until 1996 for seminars on a variety of topics. In January 1997, it reorganized as a web-based publication maintained by the Edge Foundation (edge.org).

It was founded as a salon by literary agent John Brockman. He wrote books about the philosophy of science and his clients included scientific authors such as Richard Dawkins, Daniel Dennett and Steven Pinker who were the basis for the gatherings. The title of Reality Club was a pun, as a theme was the nature of reality in the context of the clash between concepts such as post-structuralism and scientific realism.

== Attendees ==
- Isaac Asimov
- Daniel Hillis
- John Searle
- Gerd Stern
