= Jennifer Jacquet =

American professor

External videos
- Jennifer Jacquet On How You Can Help Save Sea Life, WGBH, Alison Bruzek & Catherine Whelan, May 20, 2014

Jennifer Jacquet is an American researcher and a professor of environmental science and policy at the Rosenstiel School of Marine, Atmospheric, and Earth Science, at the University of Miami. She also works as an associate director of research at Brown University's Climate Social Science Network. From 2012 to 2022, she worked at New York University's Department of Environmental Studies.

Her areas of interest include "marine ecology; conservation & evolutionary biology; cooperation; social approval; the evolution and function of guilt, honor, and shame, and the role of information technology in shaping environmental action", with a particular emphasis on tragedy of the commons issues.

She read at the New York State Writers Institute, and published articles in Wired.

== Education ==
Born in 1980, she grew up in Ohio. She graduated from Western Washington University, from Cornell University, and from University of British Columbia.

== Books ==
- The Playbook. How to Deny Science, Sell Lies, and Make a Killing in the Corporate World. Pantheon 2022, ISBN 978-1101871010.
- Is Shame Necessary?: New Uses for an Old Tool. Knopf Doubleday Publishing Group. February 17, 2015. ISBN 978-0-307-90758-5.
