= Crazy Hedgy =

2011 video game

- Key art
- Developer: Cybertime
- Publisher: Cybertime
- Director: Chris Graham
- Producers: Raffael Leb; Nikolay Blagoev
- Programmers: Nikolay Blagoev; Tino Eppensteiner
- Artist: Fritz Dorfner
- Composer: Sound of Games
- Platforms: iOS, Android
- Release: iOS; WW: December 20, 2011; Android; WW: January 14, 2016
- Genres: 3D platformer, Beat 'em up
- Mode: Single-player

Crazy Hedgy is a 2011 3D platformer video game with beat 'em up mechanics, developed and published by Cybertime for mobile devices. It was released on iOS in 2011 and Android in 2016, but has since been delisted from both.

Players are tasked with navigating its hedgehog protagonist through various cartoony obstacle courses, collecting gems and coins to purchase upgrades and defeating enemies via jumps, punches, throws or unlockable weapons, making use of the smart device's built-in accelerometer to enable tilt controls. As the first project of the video game department of Austrian animation studio Cybertime, the game was particularly praised for its graphical appeal.

== Gameplay ==
The game sees the titular protagonist Hedgy finding out that something is wrong in the fictional cartoon fantasy setting of Green Hedges, leading him to search for the cause. On the way, he encounters various enemies like the mushroom-themed Spankos, forcing him to jump and fight his way to the end.

Screenshot from the Android version of the game

Played as a linear 3D platformer, in its main story mode, players must navigate through 35 levels, broken up into three themed worlds (each concluding with a boss fight), with the aim of reaching their end while avoiding bottomless pits, enemy NPCs and traps. Hedgy has the ability to double jump, levitating for a short time by blowing bubble gum in the air.
Additionally, vehicle sections on rafts or in buckets force players to quickly dodge oncoming obstacles.

The game's enemies can be dealt with by either jumping on their heads, punching or grabbing them, with the latter making it possible to throw them in the direction of other enemies, objects or traps which react naturally in accordance with the title's physics engine (with battling being the main focus in the game's arena mode, unlocked after collecting enough coins). Doing so will start a combo, awarding higher scores. When damaged, the player loses one of three hearts, which can be replenished by finding and eating apples.

Upgrades such as protective helmets, stronger boxing gloves, earthquake-inducing slam abilities or a bubble gum gun can be purchased either with the collectible gems found throughout each level or with coins earned by completing a stage. While the title originally lacked any microtransactions, later updates allowed players to purchase more gems and coins with real currency or by watching advertisements.

Initially, movement was exclusively controlled via tilt controls, as tilting the device would cause Hedgy to roll into the respective direction. Tapping the right side of the screen caused a jump and tapping the left triggered a punch, with occasional quick time events demanding players tap designated spots on the touchscreen. With version 2.5, this was changed to a tank controls system, where Hedgy's direction would be determined by tilting, while forward or backward movement was determined by a touch-controlled slider on screen.

== Development and release ==
Since its founding in 2001, the Vienna-based animation studio Cybertime had specialised in creating 3D animations and special effects. According to founder and CEO Raffael Leb, development of a 3D mobile game was viewed internally as a novel opportunity to apply these existing skillsets, leading to the establishment of an in-house games department. After an estimated 6,000 hours of development time, spread across three years, the title was released for iOS devices on December 20, 2011. It would go on to receive substantial updates afterwards:

- Update 2.0, intended to improve the game's graphics, was issued on June 21, 2012.
- Update 2.1 added support for newer mobile devices, new upgrades, as well as in-game challenges on December 19, 2012.
- Update 2.5 shifted the title to a free-to-play model (removing the original $2.99 price tag, but introducing microtransactions), as well as changing parts of the soundtrack, Hedgy's character design and the control scheme on March 10, 2015.
- Update 2.5.3, issued on September 10, 2019 to add iOS 10 and iOS Metal support, was the last update to the iOS version of the game before it was delisted sometime after 2021.

An Android version, originally intended to be released in early 2012, was published on January 14, 2016, but would eventually be delisted on January 9, 2018.

== Reception ==
Reception

Aggregate score
Aggregator	Score
Metacritic	75/100

Review scores
Publication	Score
Pocket Gamer	4/5 stars
TouchArcade	4/5 stars

The game received "generally favorable" reviews according to the review aggregation website Metacritic.

Particular praise was directed towards its visual presentation, with the detailed 3D-modeled environments and characters as well as animations and particle effects being noted as standouts among mobile games of the time. Furthermore, reviewers noted strong gameplay variety, satisfying platforming and fighting as well as sufficient replay value to justify its initial asking price.

The main points of criticism were the title's lack of imagination and creativity when it came to its levels as well as the potentially off-putting control scheme. Some critics noted strong similarities between Crazy Hedgy and video games released by Sega, with the game's tilt controls resembling those of the iOS releases of Super Monkey Ball, whereas the concept of a cartoon hedgehog platforming mascot drew comparisons to Sonic the Hedgehog.

Crazy Hedgy was awarded "Best Game of the Year" at the Content Award Vienna as well as "Best New Game" and "Best Platformer" as part of Apple App Store features.
