= Harold Meyerson =

American journalist (born 1950)

- Born: 1950 (age 75–76); Los Angeles, U.S.
- Education: B.A. Columbia University
- Occupation: Journalist

Harold Meyerson (born 1950) is an American journalist, opinion columnist and socialist. In 2009 The Atlantic Monthly named him one of "the most influential commentators in the nation" as part of their list "The Atlantic 50."

== Early life and education ==
Meyerson was born to a Jewish family in Los Angeles. He was educated in the Los Angeles public schools and at Columbia University. The son of long time leaders in California of the Socialist Party of America, he was active in the 1970s in the Democratic Socialist Organizing Committee.

== Career ==
Meyerson is editor-at-large of The American Prospect and was an opinion columnist for The Washington Post from 2003 until 2015, when he was fired by the latter. Some speculate that the firing was politically motivated and related to the 2016 electoral season and the rise of Bernie Sanders. He served as executive editor of the L.A. Weekly from 1989 through 2001, and continues to write about California politics in the Los Angeles Times. His articles on politics, labor, the economy, foreign policy, and American culture have also appeared in The New Yorker, The Atlantic, The New Republic, The Nation, and New Statesman.

He is the author of Who Put The Rainbow in The Wizard of Oz?, a biography of Broadway lyricist Yip Harburg, and his articles have been republished in several books, most notably the Brookings Institution's volume on Bush v. Gore. From 1991 through 1995, Meyerson hosted the weekly show "Real Politics" on the NPR station KCRW in Los Angeles. He has been a frequent guest on television and radio talk shows, including "The Four O'Clock Report" with Jon Wiener on KPFK in Los Angeles.

An avowed democratic socialist—according to Meyerson one of only "two" that he encounters during "daily rounds through the nation's capital", the other being Senator Bernie Sanders of Vermont—he was an honorary vice-chair of the National Political Committee of the Democratic Socialists of America, until such positions were abolished in 2017. Like Sanders, Meyerson thinks the US would benefit from adopting Scandinavian social capitalist policies.

== Personal life ==
He currently shares his time between Washington, D.C., and Los Angeles.
