= The Fox and the Cat (fable) =

Ancient fable

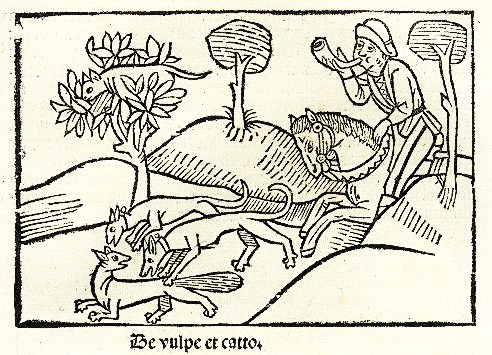
- Heinrich Steinhöwel's 1476 illustration of the fable

Folk tale
- Name: The Fox and the Cat
- Aarne–Thompson grouping: ATU 105
- Country: Multiple
- Published in: Panchatantra

The Fox and the Cat is an ancient fable, with both Eastern and Western analogues involving different animals, that addresses the difference between resourceful expediency and a master stratagem. Included in collections of Aesop's fables since the start of printing in Europe, it is number 605 in the Perry Index. In the basic story a cat and a fox discuss how many tricks and dodges they have. The fox boasts that he has many; the cat confesses to having only one. When hunters arrive with their dogs, the cat climbs a tree, but the fox thinks of many ways without acting and is caught by the hounds. Many morals have been drawn from the fable's presentations through history and, as Isaiah Berlin's use of it in his essay "The Hedgehog and the Fox" shows, it continues to be interpreted anew.

== History ==
The fable contrasts the fate of one animal - proud of the many stratagems at its disposal with another - possessing one simple trick. In time of danger it is that one trick that proves more effective than the many options. A story of world-wide popularity and many variations, it is listed as type 105 in the Aarne-Thompson-Uther folklore index.

There is a proverb in a fragment attributed to the ancient Greek poet Archilochus: πόλλ' οἶδ' ἀλώπηξ, ἀλλ' ἐχῖνος ἓν μέγα (the fox knows many little things, but the hedgehog knows one big thing). In Erasmus' Adagia from 1500, the expression is recorded in Latin as Multa novit vulpes, verum echinus unum magnum. This proverb seems to imply the existence of an ancient fable involving a hedgehog instead of a cat, as do some folktales from the Balkans.

=== Eastern ===
The analogous story of "Hundred-wit, Thousand-wit and Single-wit" appears in the fifth division of the Panchatantra which considers the consequences of ill-considered action. The tale concerns two fish and a frog who debate how to avoid being taken by fishermen in the pond they inhabit. Single-wit the frog advises flight and is the only one to escape being caught.

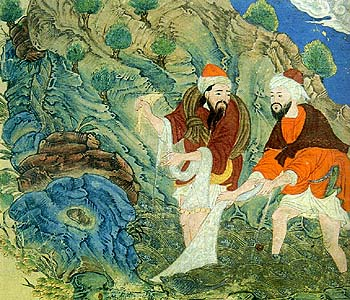
An illustration of "Three Fish" from Kalila and Dimna

The story was also preserved in the Persian Kalila and Dimna as a tale of three fish, one wise, one clever and one stupid. When the fish notice fishermen passing, the wise fish simply makes a quick exit from the pool, the clever fish manages to avoid being eaten by playing dead, while the stupid fish is caught and eaten. Rumi, writing in the 13th century, used this story in Book IV of his Masnavi, drawing from it the advisability of resigning one's identity into the wholeness of the Creator.

The analogue in the ancient Indian Mahabharata has the swan and the crow as protagonists. The swan has only one way to fly while the crow boasts of a hundred and one. The crow, however, gets himself into trouble with his displays of aerobatics when he ends up far out over the ocean, unable to find a place to land. The swan flies down to the crow asking "Which of the hundred and one ways of flying is this?" before carrying him, suitably humbled, back to safety.

=== European ===
Written records of this fable type do not appear in Europe after Archilochus until Medieval times. Here the boastful animal is generally the fox, but the animal with the one trick may be the hedgehog (Greece), the crane (Russia), the squirrel (Armenia), or the cock or dove. In western Europe, it is always the cat, appearing in very similar versions, though with variation in the number of tricks the fox possesses. Some of the collections with this variation include the Anglo-Latin Romulus (80 tricks), Marie de France's Ysopet (2 tricks, "and a whole sackful besides"), as well as the fable collections of Odo of Cheriton (17 tricks in a bag) and John Sheppey. In the German folk version collected by the Grimm Brothers, it is of a hundred tricks that the fox brags, "and a whole sackful of cunning".

The fox is known for his craftiness in Western fables, and sometimes the fabulists go into more naturalistic detail in their retellings. In the contemporary poem "The Owl and the Nightingale", for instance, the nightingale, arguing that its one ability (to sing in summertime) is worth more than all the skills of the owl, describes some of the fox's devices, the feints and devious courses it takes to outwit the dogs: "The fox can creep along the hedge and turn off from his earlier route, and shortly afterwards double back on it, then the hound is thrown off the scent" (þe uox kan crope bi þe heie an turne ut from his forme weie an eft sone kume þarto þonne is þe hundes smel fordo).

For the preacher Odo, the cat represented those who know the single scheme, to "spring into heaven", while the fox stands for "attorneys, casuists, tricksters" and others with a "bagful of tricks". The interpretation in the 13th century Gesta Romanorum is very similar, making a distinction between "the simple men and women who know but one craft, that is to call to God", and those that make a living by the glibness of their tongues. The moral supplied by Marie de France is different, though perhaps complementary: that a wise man would be able to detect a liar, however plausibly he talked. Berechiah ha-Nakdan followed her by including the tale as number 94 of his hundred Fox Fables in Hebrew. His moral is different in emphasis again, contrasting simple, necessary labour with status-consciousness. For him the fox represented those who despise and neglect basic work to look after themselves and sustain their families, those who say "our hand is too lofty to put sickle to standing grain" and boast of their professions: "I am a scribe; I am a smith, I am a tailor; I am a goldsmith, I am a merchant; I am a sage, and what other is there like me to equal me?"

In William Caxton's 1484 collection of Aesop's fables, this one is told about people who have pretensions of wisdom and subtlety, but who in fact are "grete fooles and knowynge no thynge". Another landmark in the fable's history was its inclusion in Jean de La Fontaine's influential Fables Choisies (IX.14, published in 1678). With La Fontaine, the fable has moved from the pulpit to the salon and his telling of this tale is typically lighter and more urbane in tone; the truth the tale points up for him is a question of expediency rather than the grave moral failure seen by earlier authors. Here the cat and the fox are travelling together and, as "the way was long and therefore wearisome, so they shortened it by arguing. Argumentation is a great help. Without it one would go to sleep. Our pilgrims shouted themselves hoarse. Then having argued themselves out, they talked of other things." The fable proceeds as in earlier versions and La Fontaine finishes with the practical moral: "Too many expedients may spoil the business. One loses time in choosing between them and in trying too many. Have only one; but let it be a good one."

The American composer Vincent Persichetti included this version as the fourth piece in his Fables for narrator and orchestra (1943).

== The Hedgehog and the Fox ==
The main difference from the version of the fable with a hedgehog is that the contrast in the ancient version is between flight and defence rather than between strategies of flight, as in the cat and fox version. In early Renaissance times, the writer Laurentius Abstemius questioned whether the cat's instinctive solution is ultimately better than the fox's ingenuity by rewriting the fable as De lepore sese vulpi praeferente ob pedum velocitatem (a hare preferring itself to the fox on account of its fleetness). While the hare vaunts itself on its superior speed, the fox points out that its own slyness has been a better means of survival. The author sums up by saying that intelligence is the better quality.

The question has remained open and the different behaviours have been reinterpreted in other ways since. In his essay "The Hedgehog and the Fox", originally written in 1953, the philosopher Isaiah Berlin uses the fable as summed up by Archilochus to divide writers and thinkers into two categories: hedgehogs, who view the world through the lens of a single defining idea; and foxes, who draw on a wide variety of experiences and for whom the world cannot be boiled down to a single idea. The essay, though not meant too seriously by Berlin, has proved influential, with a number of writers using his distinction.

Stephen Jay Gould's anthology The Hedgehog, the Fox, and the Magister's Pox uses both Berlin's book and the fable in exploring the complex relationship between the sciences and the humanities. Gould sees Archilochus's original image as containing two levels of metaphorical meaning for human contrasts. "The first speaks of psychological styles... Scramble or persist." The second is a question of intellectual practice: "Diversify and color, or intensify and cover", a union of the two strategies being the most fruitful for understanding between the two disciplines.

The abstract sculptor Richard Serra also cites Isaiah Berlin's essay as the source of the title of his The Hedgehog and the Fox (1999), in the grounds of Princeton University. Serra explained at the time of the sculpture's installation, "It points to how scholars either become free thinkers and invent or become subjugated to the dictates of history. This is the classical problem posed to every student." His reading therefore reverses the moral order of the original fable. The hedgehog, being resistant to change, is intellectually dead; the fox's adaptability (demonstrated by sculpture's relationship to its environment) is the correct strategy for intellectual development and survival.
