= Intelligent Thought =

Book by John Brockman

Intelligent Thought: Science Versus the Intelligent Design Movement
- Cover
- Editor: John Brockman
- Language: English
- Subject: Intelligent design movement
- Publisher: Vintage Books
- Publication date: 2006
- Publication place: United States
- Media type: Print (paperback)
- Pages: 256
- ISBN: 0-307-27722-4
- OCLC: 65978673
- Dewey Decimal: 231.7/652 22
- LC Class: BL262 .I58 2006

Intelligent Thought: Science Versus the Intelligent Design Movement is a 2006 book edited by John Brockman and published by Vintage Books. The book is a series of essays which discuss the idea that natural selection and evolution helps explain the world better than intelligent design. The contributors are Daniel Dennett, Scott Atran, Steven Pinker, Nicholas Humphrey, Tim White, Neil Shubin, Marc Hauser, Richard Dawkins, Jerry Coyne, Leonard Susskind, Frank Sulloway, Lee Smolin, Stuart A. Kauffman, Seth Lloyd, Lisa Randall, and Scott Sampson.

== See also ==
- List of scientific societies rejecting intelligent design
