= The Two Cultures =

1959 lecture and book by C. P. Snow

- Author: C. P. Snow
- Subject: Science
- Genre: Non-fiction
- Published: 1959
- Publisher: Oxford University Press

"The Two Cultures" is the first part of an influential 1959 Rede Lecture by British scientist and novelist C. P. Snow. The lecture was published that same year in book form as The Two Cultures and the Scientific Revolution. Snow's thesis was that science and the humanities, which represented "the intellectual life of the whole of western society", had become divided into "two cultures", and that the growing division between them was a major handicap in solving the world's problems.

== The lecture ==
The talk was delivered 7 May 1959 in the Senate House, Cambridge, and subsequently published as The Two Cultures and the Scientific Revolution. The lecture and book expanded upon an article by Snow published in the New Statesman of 6 October 1956, also titled "The Two Cultures". The book form of Snow's lecture was widely read and discussed on both sides of the Atlantic, leading him to write a 1963 follow-up, The Two Cultures: And a Second Look: An Expanded Version of the Two Cultures and the Scientific Revolution.

Snow's position can be summed up by an oft-repeated passage from his lecture:

A good many times I have been present at gatherings of people who, by the standards of the traditional culture, are thought highly educated and who have with considerable gusto been expressing their incredulity at the illiteracy of scientists. Once or twice I have been provoked and have asked the company how many of them could describe the Second Law of Thermodynamics. The response was cold: it was also negative. Yet I was asking something which is the scientific equivalent of: Have you read a work of Shakespeare's? I now believe that if I had asked an even simpler question – such as, What do you mean by mass, or acceleration, which is the scientific equivalent of saying, Can you read? – not more than one in ten of the highly educated would have felt that I was speaking the same language. So the great edifice of modern physics goes up, and the majority of the cleverest people in the western world have about as much insight into it as their neolithic ancestors would have had.

In 2008, The Times Literary Supplement included The Two Cultures and the Scientific Revolution in its list of the 100 books that most influenced Western public discourse since the Second World War.

Snow's Rede Lecture condemned the British educational system as having, since the Victorian era, over-rewarded the humanities (especially Latin and Greek) at the expense of scientific and engineering education, despite such achievements having been so decisive in winning the Second World War for the Allies. This in practice deprived British elites (in politics, administration, and industry) of adequate preparation to manage the modern scientific world. By contrast, Snow said, German and American schools sought to prepare their citizens equally in the sciences and humanities, and better scientific teaching enabled these countries' rulers to compete more effectively in a scientific age. Later discussion of The Two Cultures tended to obscure Snow's initial focus on differences between British systems (of both schooling and social class) and those of competing countries.

== Implications and influence ==
The literary critic F. R. Leavis called Snow a "public relations man" for the scientific establishment in his essay Two Cultures?: The Significance of C. P. Snow, published in The Spectator in 1962. The article attracted a great deal of negative correspondence in the magazine's letters pages.

In his 1963 book, Snow appeared to revise his thinking and was more optimistic about the potential of a mediating third culture. This notion was further developed in John Brockman's The Third Culture: Beyond the Scientific Revolution (1995).

Simon Critchley, in Continental Philosophy: A Very Short Introduction (2001) suggests:

[Snow] diagnosed the loss of a common culture and the emergence of two distinct cultures: those represented by scientists on the one hand and those Snow termed 'literary intellectuals' on the other. If the former are in favour of social reform and progress through science, technology and industry, then intellectuals are what Snow terms 'natural Luddites' in their understanding of and sympathy for advanced industrial society. In Mill's terms, the division is between Benthamites and Coleridgeans.

Critchley argues that what Snow said represents a resurfacing of a discussion current in the mid-nineteenth century. Critchley describes the Leavis contribution to the making of a controversy as "a vicious ad hominem attack"; going on to describe the debate as "a familiar clash in English cultural history", citing also T. H. Huxley and Matthew Arnold.

Stephen Jay Gould's The Hedgehog, the Fox, and the Magister's Pox (2003) provides a different perspective. Assuming the dialectical interpretation, it argues that Snow's concept of "two cultures" is not only off the mark, it is a damaging and short-sighted viewpoint, and that it has perhaps led to decades of unnecessary fence-building.

In a New York Times retrospective on the 50th anniversary of the lecture, Peter Dizikes situated Snow's thesis in a Cold War context. Snow had geopolitical concerns, according to Dizikes, that the worsening split between science and the humanities was placing the West at a disadvantage in its struggle with the Eastern Bloc.

In his opening address at the Munich Security Conference in January 2014, the Estonian president Toomas Hendrik Ilves said that the current problems related to security and freedom in cyberspace are the culmination of absence of dialogue between "the two cultures":

Today, bereft of understanding of fundamental issues and writings in the development of liberal democracy, computer geeks devise ever better ways to track people... simply because they can and it's cool. Humanists on the other hand do not understand the underlying technology and are convinced, for example, that tracking meta-data means the government reads their emails.

== Antecedents ==
Contrasting scientific and humanistic knowledge is a repetition of the Methodenstreit of 1890 German universities. A quarrel in 1911 between Benedetto Croce and Giovanni Gentile on the one hand and Federigo Enriques on the other one is believed to have had enduring effects in the separation of the two cultures in Italy and to the predominance of the views of (objective) idealism over those of (logical) positivism. In the social sciences it is also commonly proposed as the quarrel of positivism versus interpretivism.

== See also ==
- Consilience: The Unity of Knowledge, a 1998 book written by biologist Edward Osborne Wilson, as an attempt to bridge the gap between "the two cultures"
- Culture war
- Interdisciplinarity, a movement to cross boundaries between academic disciplines, including the divide between "the two cultures"
- Quarrel of the Ancients and the Moderns
- Science wars
- The Third Culture
