= John Brockman (literary agent) =

American literary agent and author

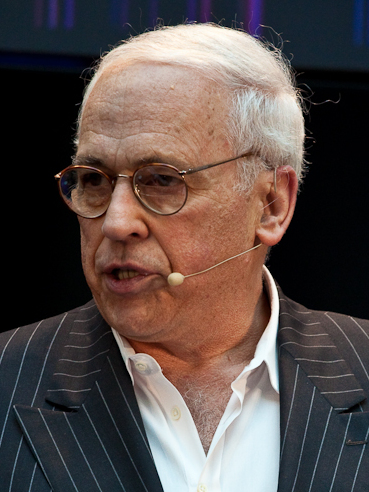
- Brockman in 2009
- Born: February 16, 1941 (age 85); Boston, Massachusetts, U.S.
- Education: Babson College; Columbia Business School (MBA)
- Occupations: Literary agent, editor, writer

John Brockman (born February 16, 1941) is an American literary agent and author specializing in scientific literature. He established the Edge Foundation, an online magazine exploring scientific and intellectual ideas. He was also closely connected to Jeffrey Epstein.

== Early life ==
Brockman, born to Austrian immigrants of Jewish descent, grew up in Dorchester, which was a poor Irish Catholic enclave in Boston, Massachusetts. His father was a broker in the wholesale flower market in Boston, to hustle sales. Expanding on C. P. Snow's "two cultures", he introduced the "third culture" consisting of "those scientists and other thinkers in the empirical world who, through their work and expository writing, are taking the place of the traditional intellectual in rendering visible the deeper meanings of our lives, redefining who and what we are." Brockman attended Babson Institute (now Babson College) and earned an MBA from the Columbia Business School in 1963.

== Career ==
In 1968, Brockman organized an advertising campaign for the Monkees' film Head. Brockman's visage appeared on posters which did not mention the group, as well as in the film itself. Brockman later made a cameo appearance in the group's 1997 TV special, Hey, Hey, It's the Monkees.

Brockman led a scientific salon for 20 years, asking an annual question to a host of renowned scientists and publishing their answers in book form, which he decided to symbolically close down in 2018.

He is an editor of Edge.org. He represented many famous scientists, including Daniel Kahneman, Steven Pinker, and Richard Dawkins.

== Association with Jeffrey Epstein ==
In an interview with Prince Andrew on November 17, 2019, BBC reporter Emily Maitlis mentioned that both Andrew and John Brockman attended a dinner at child sex trafficker Jeffrey Epstein’s mansion to celebrate Epstein’s release from prison for charges which stemmed from at least one decade of child sex trafficking. Brockman's name was also found in Epstein's private jet log.

Andrew’s presence at Jeffrey Epstein’s Manhattan mansion was corroborated by Brockman himself, in emails published in an October 2019 New Republic report. The story suggested that Brockman was closely connected to Jeffrey Epstein, the financier who died in August 2019 while again awaiting trial on charges related to sex trafficking.

Brockman's literary dinners, held during the TED Conference, were, for a number of years after Epstein's conviction, almost entirely funded by Epstein as documented in his annual tax filings. This allowed Epstein to mingle with scientists, startup icons and tech billionaires.

Brockman, through dinners and salons hosted by the Edge Foundation, was also responsible for making the first introductions between Epstein and various scientists, including Seth Lloyd and Lisa Randall. Steven Pinker stated that he was convinced to fly on Epstein's private jet by Brockman.

Following the 2026 release of the expanded Epstein files, social media posts highlighted a 2018 email authored by Brockman in which he referenced "a dozen one-year-olds." According to Brockman's family, the email was referring to his granddaughter's first birthday party.

== Bibliography ==
=== Books as author ===
- (1969) By the Late John Brockman ISBN 978-0062326782
- (1970) 37 ISBN 978-0030850523
- (1973) Afterwords: Explorations of the Mystical Limits of Contemporary Reality ISBN 978-0385015547
- (1995) The Third Culture: Beyond the Scientific Revolution ISBN 978-0684803593

=== Books as co-author ===
==== With Edwin Schlossberg ====
- (1975) The Pocket Calculator Game Book ISBN 0-688-02983-3
- (1977) The Philosopher's Game: Match Your Wits Against the 100 Greatest Thinkers of All Time ISBN 978-0241898277
- (1977) The Kids' Pocket Calculator Game Book ISBN 9780688082338
- (1977) The 1977-78 CB Guide ISBN 978-0553105070
- (1977) The Pocket Calculator Game Book 2 ISBN 978-0552980340
- (1977) The Home Computer Handbook (also with Lyn Horton) ISBN 978-0806930961
- (1985) The Kinks Kronikles (also with John Mendelssohn) ISBN 978-0688029838

==== With Edward Rosenfeld ====
- (1973) Real Time 1: A Catalog of Ideas and Information ISBN 978-0385083898
- (1973) Real Time 2: A Catalog of Ideas and Information ISBN 978-0385022248

=== Books as editor ===
==== The Reality Club Series ====
- (1990) Speculations: The Reality Club ISBN 978-0138262150
- (1991) Doing Science: The Reality Club 2 ISBN 978-0137950973
- (1991) Ways of Knowing: The Reality Club 3 ISBN 978-0135172360
- (1993) Creativity: The Reality Club 4 ISBN 9780671789268

==== Edge Question series ====
- (2005) What We Believe but Cannot Prove: Today's Leading Thinkers on Science in the Age of Certainty ISBN 978-1849832175
- (2006) What Is Your Dangerous Idea?: Today's Leading Thinkers on the Unthinkable ISBN 978-0743295536
- (2007) What Are You Optimistic About?: Today's Leading Thinkers on Why Things Are Good and Getting Better ISBN 978-0061870033
- (2009) What Have You Changed Your Mind About?: Today's Leading Minds Rethink Everything. 150 high-powered thinkers discuss their most telling missteps and reconsiderations with Alan Alda, Brian Eno, Ray Kurzweil, Irene Pepperberg, Steven Pinker, Lisa Randall etc. ISBN 978-0061686542
- (2009) This Will Change Everything: Ideas That Will Shape the Future (with Patrick Bateson, Oliver Morton, Stephen Schneider, Stewart Brand, Brian Eno, K. Eric Drexler, and others) ISBN 978-0061899676
- (2011) Is the Internet Changing the Way You Think?: The Net's Impact on Our Minds and Future ISBN 978-0062020444
- (2012) This Will Make You Smarter: New Scientific Concepts to Improve Your Thinking ISBN 978-0062109392
- (2013) This Explains Everything: Deep, Beautiful, and Elegant Theories of How the World Works ISBN 978-0062230171
- (2014) What Should We Be Worried About?: The Hidden Threats Nobody Is Talking About ISBN 978-0062296238
- (2015) This Idea Must Die: Scientific Theories that are Blocking Progress ISBN 978-0062374349
- (2015) What to Think About Machines That Think: Today's Leading Thinkers on the Age of Machine Intelligence ISBN 978-0062425652
- (2017) Know This: Today's Most Interesting and Important Scientific Ideas, Discoveries, and Developments ISBN 978-0062562067
- (2018) This Idea is Brilliant: Lost, Overlooked, and Underappreciated Scientific Concepts Everyone Should Know ISBN 978-0062698216
- (2019) The Last Unknowns: Deep, Elegant, Profound, UNANANSWERED QUESTIONS About the Universe, the Mind, the Future of Civilization, and the Meaning of Life ISBN 978-0062897947

==== Best of Edge series ====
- (2011) The Mind: Leading Scientists Explore the Brain, Memory, Personality, and Happiness ISBN 978-0062025845
- (2011) Culture: Leading Scientists Explore Societies, Art, Power, and Technology ISBN 978-0062023131
- (2013) Thinking: The New Science of Decision-Making, Problem-Solving, and Prediction in Life and Markets ISBN 978-0062258540
- (2014) The Universe: Leading Scientists Explore the Origin, Mysteries, and Future of the Cosmos ISBN 978-0062296085
- (2016) Life: The Leading Edge of Evolutionary Biology, Genetics, Anthropology, and Environmental Science ISBN 978-0062296054

==== Other books ====
- (1977) About Bateson ISBN 978-0525474692
- (1986) Einstein, Gertrude Stein, Wittgenstein & Frankenstein: Re-inventing the Universe ISBN 978-0670804801
- (1995) The Third Culture: Beyond the Scientific Revolution ISBN 978-0684803593
- (1996) How Things Are: A Science Tool-Kit for the Mind (with Katinka Matson), Harper Perennial ISBN 978-0688133566
- (1996) Digerati: Encounters with the Cyber Elite ISBN 978-1888869040
- (2000) The Greatest Inventions of the Past 2,000 Years ISBN 978-0684859989
- (2002) The Next Fifty Years: Science in the First Half of the Twenty-First Century ISBN 978-0375713422
- (2002) The New Humanists: Science at the Edge ISBN 978-0760745298
- (2004) Curious Minds: How a Child becomes a Scientist ISBN 978-0375422911
- (2006) My Einstein: Essays by Twenty-four of the World's Leading Thinkers on the Man, His Work, and His Legacy ISBN 978-0375423451
- (2006) Intelligent Thought: Science Versus the Intelligent Design Movement ISBN 978-0307277220
- (2019) Possible Minds: Twenty-Five Ways of Looking at AI ISBN 978-0525557999

== See also ==
- List of people named in the Epstein files
