= Kiroileva siili =

Finnish comic strip

Kiroileva siili (Finnish for "the swearing hedgehog") is a comic strip written and drawn by Finnish artist Milla Paloniemi originally from Jalasjärvi.

The strip stars a hedgehog, who is aggressive and prone to profanity, and the last panel of the strip is usually abundant with swearwords. The strip received attention when it was featured in the Ilta-Sanomat newspaper in January 2007, which caused the self-published album Kiroileva siili to rise as the top-selling comic album of the Academic Bookstore. In February 2007, the publishing company Sammakko published a hardcover collection of Kiroileva siili strips, which rose to the most-sold book in Finland for the entire spring. At the Kemi comics days in 2007, Milla Paloniemi was awarded the Strippi-Lempi award for her comic Kiroileva siili. In 2008, the strip won its first Comics Finlandia prize.

== Characters ==
- The swearing hedgehog: The titular character, who swears practically the entire time. The swearing hedgehog is in love with the girl hedgehog and shows this in his own way. A fox ate his father, when he was a few weeks old. This hedgehog's family is from Ostrobothnia, and the hedgehogs speak in the South Ostrobothnian dialect.
- The girl hedgehog: A resourceful female hedgehog whom the swearing hedgehog is in love with. The girl hedgehog thinks the swearing hedgehog is cute when he's angry.
- The city hedgehog: The city hedgehog lives in the city and eats mainly pizza. He doesn't eat worms. The city hedgehog is also constantly smoking. The swearing hedgehog and the city hedgehog met when the swearing hedgehog ended up in the city.
- Grandma hedgehog: The swearing hedgehog's grandmother. The grandma hedgehog has only few spikes and no teeth left, but she defends herself with a puukko knife. Only the grandma hedgehog can make the swearing hedgehog silent. She is the absolute boss of the hedgehog family.
- Antti: The swearing hedgehog's friend. Antti is an Egyptian long-eared hedgehog and lives as a pet in the same house as the swearing hedgehog. Antti alternates between idolizing and annoying the swearing hedgehog. Antti doesn't understand much of the world and tends to forget things, including forgetting that he is a hedgehog.
- The small hedgehog: The small hedgehog is Antti's friend and lives as a pet in the same house. The small hedgehog is an African dwarf hedgehog.

== Publications ==
- Kiroileva siili, web comic, from 2003 on
- Kiroileva siili, wall calendar, 2005
- Kiroileva siili, self-published, 2005 (photocopied album sold at the Helsinki comics festival)
- Kiroileva siili, self-published, 2006
- Kiroileva siili, Sammakko, 2007
