= The Hedgehog, the Fox, and the Magister's Pox =

2003 book by Stephen Jay Gould

The Hedgehog, the Fox, and the Magister's Pox: Mending the Gap Between Science and the Humanities
- Author: Stephen Jay Gould
- Language: English
- Subject: Science
- Publisher: Harmony Books
- Publication date: 2003
- Publication place: United States
- Media type: Print
- ISBN: 978-0-609-60140-2
- OCLC: 298587266
- Dewey Decimal: 303.48/3 21
- LC Class: Q175.55 .G68 2003

The Hedgehog, the Fox, and the Magister's Pox is a posthumous volume by Stephen Jay Gould released in 2003 exploring the historically complex relationship between the sciences and the humanities in a scholarly discourse.

Employing the Greek proverb about the crafty cunning fox that devises many strategies versus the persistent hedgehog who knows one effective strategy, Gould offers a study of the division between the two ways of knowing, attempting to debunk the commonly assumed inextricable conflict between science and the arts as the two falsely opposed realms of the pursuit of knowledge.

== Four historical periods ==
Gould prefers to focus on the commonalities between the humanities and the sciences, such as creative thinking and the psychology of transcendence and discovery. He discusses four historic periods in which the supposed Science wars have been characterized falsely. In each case, the strategy for either side has been to portray centrist members of the opposing camp with radical minority views of extremist strawmen, so as to easily defeat these misrepresentations of otherwise-rational mainstream arguments. He stresses the dangers of presenting cut and dried dichotomies, such as good vs. bad or spirit vs. matter, or focusing on polar positions within continuous ranges of actions, methods, discourse and beliefs.

The first period is represented by the leaders of the Scientific Revolution in the seventeenth century, the vast majority of whom had sincere religious convictions. Atheism was extremely rare among these scholars. In the Renaissance, which preceded the period under consideration, scholars focused on the recovery of lost knowledge with an associated reverence for the Ancients. Renaissance compendiums of knowledge did not necessarily discriminate between truth and fiction. Both were domains of human opinion and thought regarded as noteworthy, especially when associated with authoritative classical sources, and distinguishing differences between fact and opinion was not always valued above providing readers with complete documentation. Leaders of the Scientific Revolution, being the new kids on the block with respect to the established scholastics, were forced to emphasize the value of their enterprise in order to receive resources or merit for their investigations. This meant contrasting their methods and goals with that of the established scholars. They did meet with resistance, but many of the religious scholars accepted the newly discovered knowledge of the Scientific Revolution as valid.

Gould refers to some of the Roman Catholic clergy in Galileo's day that valued the new methods. He also cites theologian Reverend Thomas Burnet, whose 1680 Sacred Theory of the Earth argued that God created a clockwork world with physical laws that did not require miracles or tampering with. Isaac Newton, who accepted God's occasional intervention, criticized Burnet for not recognizing God's option for miracles. Gould cites John Ray's preface in 1678 to The Ornithology of Francis Willughby, which stated that their scientific treatise did not pay undue attention to literary style, instead utilizing methods of direct observation and validation of factual accuracy, in contrast to Renaissance compendia. Such statements of worth were necessary to receive recognition for progress in scientific methodology, but were not made to denigrate the humanities. Statements such as Isaac Newton's less than original "If I have seen further, it is by standing on the shoulders of giants." was recognition not only of other previous leaders in the Scientific Revolution, but of the Ancients who provided foundations in the sciences and humanities. Gould cites George Hakewill, Archdeacon of Surrey's 1628 essay in defense of Modernist convictions. There Hakewill argues against both the common belief that the Universe was in constant decay and the Renaissance portrayal of Ancients as superior to Moderns. Moderns were traditionally depicted in architecture and other arts even prior to the seventeenth century as dwarfs on the shoulders of Ancient giants. Hakewill stated "we are all of one stature, save that we are lifted up somewhat higher by their means". Gould argues that "nearly all founders of the Scientific Revolution revered the great sources of Antiquity. ...The ranks of the Modernists did not include only the new scientific scholars, but also encompassed many prominent intellectuals from literary and other humanistic callings, including the theologian Hakewell."

Gould's stage two is the misrepresentation of late nineteenth century's rationalism vs. religion conflict. Gould cites J.W. Draper's 1874 History of the Conflict Between Science and Religion and Andrew Dickson White's 1896 A History of the Warfare of Science with Theology in Christendom as representative of the period. He describes Draper's work as describing the Roman Catholic religion as incompatible with science while the liberal American Protestantism was compatible with science. White wrote that scientific investigation was good for genuine religion. Gould cites his own book, Rocks of Ages as evidence for the independence of the non-overlapping magisteria (NOMA) of science and religion, and repeats that book's argument (which he does not claim to be the first to pen) that "Science tries to record and explain the factual character of the natural world, whereas religion struggles with spiritual and ethical questions about the meaning and proper conduct of our lives. The facts of nature simply cannot dictate correct moral behavior or spiritual meaning." He cites J. B. Russel's 1991 Inventing the Flat Earth as showing that some supporters of the science vs. religion model misrepresent historical religious advocates. One example is the caricatures of Spanish scholars as theologians arguing against Columbus that the world was flat, when in reality they were arguing actually that the circumference of the known spherical world was much larger than Columbus was assuming. Gould also refers to the misrepresentation of Galileo's trial as unjust though it was a result of Galileo's conscious undiplomatic ridiculing of the Pope's position in the Copernican debate.

The third period is represented by the C. P. Snow's 1959 Rede Lecture, The Two Cultures, and his later reevaluation and concessions with respect to the initial presentation. Snow's initial assumption is that the salvation of underdeveloped countries depends solely on the import, training and development of scientists and engineers in order for these countries to rise economically and eliminate disparities peaceably by the year 2000. Gould argues that Snow reverses his position in 1963 with The Two Cultures: A Second Look and acknowledges that the original motivating assumption of "dichotomous parsing of intellectual life into contrarian literary and scientific camps" was not a true representation and Snow was sorry for having failed to recognize a third culture in the continuous spectrum of intellectual life.

The fourth period poses the postmodern relativists against the scientific realists or "postmodern" scholars in the humanities and social-science departments of American Universities... against researchers in the conventional science departments of the same institutions." The booty being funding, power, ownership of concepts or factual truth, accolades for progress, and influence. He argues that most readings of the Sokal affair misinterpret the carelessness of individual editors of the Social Text (for not having consulted an expert in physics to "peer review" Alan Sokal's article) as a condemnation of the entire field of science studies. He goes on to argue that the science wars are without true combatants in that the vast majority of working scientists are generally too busy and unconcerned to read current valid contributions to science studies, or even to read recognized leaders in the field from the previous generation, such as Thomas Kuhn or Karl Popper. Most of Gould's contacts with colleagues revealed that they were unaware of the science war debate. This, he believes is detrimental to the working professional scientist, who would benefit from constructive criticism and insightful analysis originating outside of the sciences, and from gaining a historical perspective of their profession. He also argued that most social critics and historians of science that he was aware of were not pure relativists, and agreed that there is an external reality that may be scientifically modeled with associated benefits of acquired knowledge and applications.

== Analysis of Consilience: The Unity Of Knowledge ==
Gould includes an analysis of E. O. Wilson's book Consilience: The Unity of Knowledge within the larger scope of his recommendations for a confederation of the physical sciences and humanities. He also provides an exegesis of texts participating in the development of the word consilience within a larger historical context of the concept's inception by Reverend William Whewell, who also is said to have coined the term scientist to refer to Mary Somerville in an anonymous 1834 review of her publication in the Quarterly Review, titled On the Connexion of the Physical Sciences.

Gould proclaims William Whewell to be "the first modernist with joint command of both history and philosophy in the analysis of science" (Whewell being best known for his 1837 History of the Inductive Sciences and for his 1840 The Philosophy of the Inductive Sciences, Founded Upon Their History.). Gould also reminds the reader that he revived Whewell's concept of consilience in print, prior to Wilson.

Gould reproves Wilson's program of reductionism by utilizing two main arguments based upon the emergence and contingency or randomness found in some complex, nonlinear or non-additive systems. He indicates that there exist new entities, properties, and interactions that emerge in some complex systems which cannot be predicted from knowledge of properties of the components, or of laws governing at the level of those components alone. Thus reductionism can only fail in attempts to model, explain, or describe such systems, and we must search for and depend upon new emergent principles embedded in higher, more complex levels. He also indicates that the historical contingency in some systems may cause effects that do not necessarily strictly follow a single path from identified causes and therefore may require narrative methods drawn from historical analysis and the humanities rather that classical deductive mathematical formulas prescribing necessarily linear consequences. He highlights evolution by natural selection as a primary example of how entities such as ourselves are not a necessary, but rather a contingent product, "we have preferred to think of Homo sapiens not only as something special (which I surely do not deny), but also as something ordained, necessary, or at the very least, predictable from some form of general process... But if Homo sapiens represents more of a contingent and improbable fact of history than an apotheosis of a predictable tendency, then our peculiarities, even though they be universal within our species, remain more within the narrative realm of the sciences of historical contingency than within the traditional, and potentially reductionist, domain of repeated and predictable natural phenomenon generated by laws of nature."

Gould goes on to portray Wilson's extension (and according to him, a misleading divergent extension) of the original meaning behind Whewell's concept of "consilience of inductions" into a philosophy of all consuming reductionism in diametric opposition to Whewell's, and as an inapt attempt to subsume the independent humanities. He shows Whewell's consilience to be a literal "jumping together" in the mind of diverse facts or phenomenon initially appearing as unrelated and that such simplification and unification under the higher generality of only one theory merits the classification as probable truth and deserves further investigation and testing. But Gould stresses that Whewell defended steadfastly, the separate and independent domains or magisteria, in particular the independence of theology and ethics, citing Whewell's 1833 Astronomy and General Physics Considered with Natural Theology. Therein, Whewell defends realms of human pursuit beyond and outside of the physical sciences that are true and consistent with any truths of science, and stem from one creation and God, but are based upon different foundations and methodologies. Gould extends this defense to the humanities in general and argues that a union of equals allying the sciences and humanities requires independence and mutual respect, not a hierarchy in which the humanities are subsumed under a reductionist framework of physical science.

== See also ==
- Conflict thesis
- Relationship between religion and science
- The Hedgehog and the Fox by Isaiah Berlin
- The Two Cultures by C. P. Snow
