= The Third Culture =

1995 book by John Brockman

The Third Culture: Beyond the Scientific Revolution
- First edition
- Author: John Brockman
- Publisher: Simon & Schuster
- Publication date: 1995
- ISBN: 0-684-82344-6
- OCLC: 35515680

The Third Culture: Beyond the Scientific Revolution is a 1995 book by John Brockman which discusses the work of several well-known scientists who are directly communicating their new, sometimes provocative, ideas to the general public. John Brockman has continued the themes of 'The Third Culture' in the website of the Edge Foundation, where leading scientists and thinkers contribute their thoughts in plain English.

The title of the book refers to C. P. Snow's 1959 work The Two Cultures and the Scientific Revolution, which described the conflict between the cultures of the humanities and science.

== Contents ==
Contributions by twenty-three authors were included in the 1995 book:

- physicist Paul Davies
- biologist Richard Dawkins
- philosopher Daniel Dennett
- paleontologist Niles Eldredge
- chaos theorist J. Doyne Farmer
- theoretical physicist Murray Gell-Mann
- biologist Brian Goodwin
- geologist/biologist Stephen Jay Gould
- physicist Alan Guth
- inventor W. Daniel Hillis
- theoretical psychologist Nicholas Humphrey
- geneticist Steve Jones
- biologist Stuart Kauffman
- complex systems specialist Christopher Langton
- biologist Lynn Margulis
- mathematician and computer scientist Marvin Minsky
- mathematical physicist Roger Penrose
- cognitive scientist Steven Pinker
- theoretical astrophysicist Martin Rees
- cognitive scientist Roger Schank
- theoretical physicist Lee Smolin
- biologist Francisco Varela
- evolutionary biologist George C. Williams

The book influenced the reception of popular scientific literature in parts of the world beyond the United States. In Germany, the book inspired several newspapers to integrate scientific reports into their "Feuilleton" or "culture" sections (such as the Frankfurter Allgemeine Zeitung). At the same time, the assertions of the book were discussed as a source of controversy, especially the implicit assertion that "third culture thinking" is mainly an American development. Critics acknowledge that, whereas in the English-speaking cultures there is a large tradition of scientists writing popular books, such tradition was absent for a long period in the German and French languages, with journalists often filling the gap. However, some decades ago there were also scientists, like the physicists Heisenberg and Schrödinger and the psychologist Piaget, who fulfill the criteria Brockman named for "third culture." The German author Gabor Paal suggested that the idea of the "third culture" is a rather modern version of what Hegel called Realphilosophie (philosophy of the real).

Also, already during the interwar period, Otto Neurath and other members of the Vienna Circle strongly propagated the need for both the unity of science and the popularization of new scientific concepts. With the rise of the Nazis in Germany and Austria, many of the Vienna Circle's members left for the United States where they taught in several universities, causing their philosophical ideas to spread in the Anglo-Saxon world throughout the 1930s–1940s.
