= The Arena (novel) =

1961 novel

- First edition
- Author: William Haggard
- Language: English
- Publication date: 1961

The Arena is a 1961 suspense novel by the British author William Haggard published in England by Cassell and in the United States by Washburn. It was Haggard's third of 21 books involving his urbane protagonist Colonel Charles Russell, the head of the unobtrusive but lethal Security Executive, a government counter-intelligence agency clearly based on the actual MI5 or Security Service, where he moves easily and gracefully along C. P. Snow's Corridors of Power in Whitehall. Like all of the other works by Haggard it is a standard novel of suspense, but combined, as usual with Haggard, with other elements: the reactions of those in high government positions who fear non-political events that could endanger Britain's place in the world, along with a tough-minded, even cynical depiction of financial shenanigans in the City of London. And like Venetian Blind, Haggard's previous book, it is very much a novel of character, albeit a bleak one.

== Plot ==
Protagonist is perhaps too strong a word to describe Colonel Russell. As Haggard himself wrote about his fiction:

My novels are chiefly novels of suspense with a background of international politics. A Colonel Charles Russell of the Security Executive, a not entirely imaginary British counter-espionage organization, while not a protagonist in the technical sense, holds the story line together in the background by his operations, while the characters in the foreground carry the action."

Although Russell remains in the background for much of the book, he is nevertheless somewhat more active than in his first two appearances. In the previous book, he was sixty and supposedly about to retire; in Arena, however, no mention is made of this. His invaluable assistant from the first book, Major Mortimer, now with a first name (Robert), reappears and is in almost every scene in which Russell appears, frequently disagreeing with him about what course of action should be taken. The plot itself is straightforward: a small British company has made developments in the fields of radar and electronics that will be valuable assets for the country. It has, however, borrowed money from an old-line private bank in the City to finance this development. An unscrupulous, and highly murderous, Swiss financier is aware of this situation and determines to take over first the bank that made the loan, and then the company itself, thereby gaining control of the technological developments. The British government becomes aware of this and directs Colonel Russell to make sure that this is thwarted. Much of the book is then devoted to the character of two or three of the people most involved with the various family-owned private banks that are central to the plot. Social background—and bitter jealousies because of it—are important elements, as in many of Haggard's books, and although apparently trivial in nature lead to murderous outcomes. One of the families involved has a deep Italian heritage and so the action moves from England to Italy and back and finally ends with a deadly dénouement on the island of Capri. The resolution is highly successful for Russell and his Ministerial masters but only if its human cost is not reckoned with. From that standpoint, Russell's interventions have been bleak, grim, cynical, and morally unrewarding.

== Reception and/or Appraisal ==
At least some critics in England were enthusiastic:

New Statesman, date unknown: Could hardly be bettered in its chosen field. Nicholas Blake, Sunday Telegraph, date unknown: Fulfills one's worst apprehensions about big-business morality. Warmly recommended.
