= Herbert Edmund Howard =

English schoolmaster

Herbert Edmund Howard (16 June 1900 – 1963), who wrote novels under the pen name R. Philmore, was a history schoolmaster at Alderman Newton's School for Boys in Leicester, England. He influenced a generation of students that included several of the most distinguished historians and literary figures in the English language of the twentieth century. Among them were C. P. Snow, J. H. Plumb, Rupert Hall, and Neil McKendrick. He was recognized as a popular writer of detective crime fiction and as a frequent participant on radio quiz programmes. His work at Bletchley Park during World War II was posthumously acknowledged.

== Early life ==
Howard was born 16 June 1900 in the village of Wickham Market in Suffolk, England where his father, Herbert Edward, was a postal clerk. By the time of the 1911 census they had moved to Fakenham, a market town in Norfolk where his father had become postmaster. The household included his mother, Florence Bessie Howard, née Hall, a younger brother, Cecil, and a sister, Marjorie, the youngest sibling.

He attended King Edward VII Grammar School (now King Edward VII Academy) in King's Lynn, Norfolk. After obtaining a First in History at King's College, London, he spent a short period teaching in Eastbourne before returning to King's College and obtaining an M.A. degree. He was among the first participants in London University's Institute of Historical Research in 1921.

== Teaching career ==
After King's College, London, Howard began teaching history at Alderman Newton's School for Boys in Leicester in 1922. Over the next forty years he devoted himself to the academic, sports and social life of the school.

=== Notable students ===
Following are some students who have acknowledged their indebtedness to Howard's influence.

C. P. Snow (1905–1980) entered Alderman Newton's in 1917. His father, an accomplished organist, made a living as a clerk in a Leicester boot and shoe factory, reflecting a major industry in Leicester. Snow's three brothers also attended: William, 1910–1915; Eric, 1922–1926; and Philip, 1927–1934. Snow left as a student when Howard started at Alderman Newton's in 1922 and was qualified to go on to university, but he was to stay on for two years as a laboratory assistant until the Chemistry and Physics Department at University College Leicester was established. Howard and Snow socialized together, had a common interest in cricket, and became life-long friends. Snow succeeded in entering Christ's College, Cambridge, where he proved helpful to Howard's future Cambridge-bound students. In Snow's novel George Passant (1940), the first of the Strangers and Brothers series to appear, the character Passant is patterned after Howard. In Howard's crime novels, the detective, C. J. Swan, is patterned after Snow.

The theologian Russell Foster Aldwinckle (1911–1992), born in Leicester, entered Alderman Newton's in 1923. Howard and the headmaster, R. L. Ager, encouraged him to go on to university and he obtained a London University B.A. at University College Leicester. He earned an Oxford M.A. and a doctorate in theology from the University of Strasbourg. Most of his career was spent at McMaster University in Hamilton, Ontario, Canada from 1947 until his retirement in 1977. In an interview in 1963 he described his time at Alderman Newton's as "one of the happiest and most intellectually decisive periods of my life". In particular he singled out history under Howard as providing "a completely new invigorating approach to the subject".

Howard was the first mentor and patron of the historian John Harold Plumb (1911–2001). Born in Leicester, Plumb's father worked on the shop floor of a local shoemaking company. He attended Alderman Newton's from 1923 to 1930. After a B.A. in history from University College Leicester, he began a life-long association in 1933 with Cambridge University, first as a student at Christ's College and eventually as Master of the college. The second volume of one of his major works, the standard scholarly biography of Great Britain's first prime minister, Sir Robert Walpole, published in 1960, was dedicated to Howard. Howard's influence has been described as a "tough apprenticeship" by one of Plumb's students: "Part of Howard's inspirational teaching method consisted in the seemingly unpredictable bestowal of excessive praise alternating with devastating censure, a technique which Plumb would later use to such good—and often disconcerting—effect with his own pupils in Cambridge."

Ernest Neville Williams (1917–1993), the son of a British Railways van driver, entered Alderman Newton's in 1928 and was encouraged by Howard to take up history and pursue entry to Cambridge University. After obtaining an honors degree while at Pembroke College and after serving in the Royal Artillery during the war, he taught at several schools and published treatises on eighteenth-century English history. He was head of the history department at Dulwich College in London in 1963 when he described his background and experience at Alderman Newton's in an interview. His most inspiring influence at the school was Howard: "He particularly taught one how to think for oneself.... Howard made the whole subject come alive. With his approach to it it was not just a subject to pass at exam time. He made it something real and important to do and to explore."

The historian of science, Alfred Rupert Hall (1920–2009) attended Alderman Newton's from 1931 to 1938. His father worked in the shoemaking industry. Hall described himself as "conscious all my life of a real indebtedness to Bert". He illustrated the teaching methods of Howard, known as "Bert" to his friends, by recalling how he asked pupils to answer absurd questions such as "Which was the bigger fish: the Habsburg or the herring?" Howard by 1938 had developed Cambridge connections that he could bring to bear in assisting his most talented students. In Hall's case Howard proved instrumental in his gaining entrance to Christ's College in spite of a low ranking in the scholarship entrance examination.

Wallas Eaton (1917–1995), another protégé of Howard in the 1930s who read History and English at Christ's College, took up an acting career with the blessing of Snow and Plumb. His acting talent had been recognized at Alderman Newton's by Howard, who remarked during Eaton's last year at school, "It is a commonplace to say that he is the one great actor we have produced.:

In 1952 Neil McKendrick (born 1935), nearing the end of six years at Alderman Newton's as a science student, was persuaded by Howard that history would be a better choice for him. Howard enlisted Snow and Plumb to help in the persuasion to switch to history as providing a more likely entrée to Cambridge. McKendrick won an entrance scholarship to Christ's College, Cambridge.

=== Teaching method ===
McKendrick provides some insight into Howard's methods:

At times [his methods] were so relaxed and so free as to excite much head-masterly disapproval. He smoked in class and he drank heavily out of class. He encouraged his pupils to do the same – meeting the sixth formers in raffish pubs near the school at the end of school hours, to argue about history and life and politics. The sessions could be long and combative and could end in angry confrontation – it was an instructive precursor for those of his pupils who got to be taught by Plumb in Cambridge.

Howard never stuck to any formal syllabus. We were encouraged to read widely and to pursue any subject that we found interesting. We were encouraged to argue and debate amongst ourselves and the fact that we all met up for coffee in the town centre to do so, rather than clocking in at school, was perfectly fine as far as he was concerned.... The result of these methods was that we were encouraged to be independent, encouraged to pursue our own research, encouraged to choose our own subjects and reach our own conclusions with as little schoolmasterly intervention as possible. Standing up in class to deliver one's findings (to our fellow pupils as well as to him) encouraged us to be well prepared and to be as entertaining as possible.

Howard, in a brief history of the school under the headmaster R. L. Ager, pointed to student successes in the 1930s as a landmark when thirty-four gained admissions to Cambridge or Oxford through open competitive awards. One Head of College, he claimed, "referred to us as 'the Eton of secondary schools'". In 1955 Howard claimed a total of fifty-six such admissions to Oxford and Cambridge since this level of activity started thirty-five years earlier.

=== School sports and literary activity ===
Howard is credited with starting the school magazine, The Newtonian, with the first issue in December 1923 and overseeing it as editor for the first several years. In the volume for 1923–24 C. P. Snow is listed as sports editor and wrote the lead editorial for the third issue as well as a detailed analysis of problems of the First XI cricket team titled "The crippling effect of bad wickets" perhaps his first published writing.

Student editors and contributors supplied original short stories, satire, cartoons, essays on society and culture—politics, films, and books—as well as reports on school societies and sports. However, "H.E.H." appeared frequently as the author of brief school news notices, encomiums on school leavers, and commentaries on school cricket matches.

== Writings ==
Howard's scholarly book, The Eighteenth Century and the Revolution. (1714–1815), was a 250-page volume appearing in 1935 as the third part of a series published by Gollancz titled "An outline of European history".

Seven crime novels authored by Howard appeared under his pseudonym, R. Philmore, between 1934 and 1940.

Journey Downstairs (1934) Translated into Italian as Invito con delitto.
Riot Act (1935)
The Good Books (1936)
No Mourning in the Family (1937)
Short List (1938)
Death in Arms (1939)
Procession of Two (1940)

During C. P. Snow's tenure in the 1930s as editor of Discovery: A Monthly Popular Journal of Knowledge Howard published articles and book reviews on a variety of subjects. A contribution that is often cited is the two part article "Inquest on detective stories" in which "Philmore" describes the medical means employed in each of five famous detective novels and a physician, Dr. John Yudkin, renders a scientific verdict on their real-life plausibility. In the second part, Philmore tests the psychological validity of the motives of a number of fictional crimes. This selection appeared in two installments in Discovery for April and September 1938.

== Other activities ==
=== Yachting ===
Howard and his brother, Cecil, a teacher at City Boys' School (now The City of Leicester College) initiated sailing outings for students and staff to the lakes and rivers in the Norfolk Broads over school holidays. They provided basic crew training and put on competitive races. In 1947 they formally established the Green Wyvern Yachting Club. The name came from Alderman Newton's school colors and the City Boys' School's emblem of the wyvern which was also on the crest of the Borough of Leicester. Since then, it has broadened its membership and become a Royal Yachting Association training center. A report on the club's celebration of Cecil's eightieth birthday in 1985 noted, "A conservative estimate reckons that at least 4,000 boys have become members. Many of these members have become schoolteachers and brought their own pupils sailing – these youngsters come from all over England...."

=== Bletchley Park ===
Plumb was recruited to serve during World War II in aid of the codebreaking effort at Bletchley Park as head of the German, Italian and Japanese crypto intelligence section from 1940 to 1945. He in turn recruited Howard who worked in the Naval Section, heading Italian and Japanese crypto intelligence from 1942 to 1943. There are two contrasting evaluations of his tenure there. Snow, who had a major responsibility in recruiting scientists for the war effort, described Howard:

He was one of our great men of genius, one of our real men of genius. When still quite a young man ... he was still infinitely more useful to us in the war than any General.

Plumb, who brought Howard in mainly on account of his exceptional memory, had an alternate view:

Howard proved to be a dud. He chased the Wrens remorselessly, then fell overwhelmingly in love with a secretary and spent most of his time trying to persuade her to marry him – in office and out of office hours.

Plumb's evaluation may have been influenced by personal animus between the two at the time. McKendrick has characterized their relationship as often troubled and always "somewhat fractious".

=== Round Britain Quiz ===
Starting in 1952 Howard frequently represented the Midlands on the Round Britain Quiz BBC radio programme, which pitted regional teams against each other in pairs. Winning depended on giving the best answers to cryptic questions drawn from unpredictable fields of knowledge.

== Personal life and death ==
In an extended interview in the late 1970s Snow discussed first getting acquainted with Howard:

We rollicked around a bit in Leicester. He was a very curious man, a man of enormous sexual range. He finally took to small boys. But in those days he was mostly picking up whores in Nottingham.

In connection with his fictional character, George Passant, patterned after Howard, Snow recounted:

Of course the thing I have to tell you is this: H. E. Howard himself – the schoolmaster George Passant – was one of these multi-sexual men. There were stories of prostitutes and perverts, and he also liked small boys, as I've told you. That was what finally sank him. We had to rush him out of the country. All this was known before the police got involved.

In the interview Snow remarks on how his novel, George Passant, though published in 1940, plots a life for the eponymous character that anticipated much of Howard's fate.

Some incident or incidents may have been brought to the attention of authorities in early 1962 prompting Howard's early retirement in the spring. The school magazine outlined his forty-year career with the school and gave official thanks, adding: "His teaching reaped a rich reward of Open Scholarships but went far beyond the classroom, and where he was, life never could be dull." On 14 November 1962 Howard joined a group of past students hosting a small dinner party in Leicester for Plumb. Also in November he appeared twice on the Round Britain Quiz.

The local paper in January 1963 published a three-sentence news item stating that an arrest warrant had been issued for "Herbert Edmund Howard (63)" who had failed to appear in court on charges of "indecently assaulting two schoolboys". He never appeared in court but left for The Netherlands where he soon became ill and died. Burial was in an unmarked grave in a reusable graveyard. The school magazine noted his passing:

We are glad that some of his own pupils were able to be at his funeral in Hilversum to pay their last respects. Many more remember him as he was in the days of his strength, advising, teaching, coaching Under-14 Cricket, and feel that a landmark has been removed from their lives. As we said when he retired, the Establishment that he so often fought against has lost something in his passing.

The local paper reported on 6 November, "Mr. Howard, a bachelor, left the city early this year to live on the Continent. He died at Hilversum in the Netherlands following a cerebral hemorrhage." Accompanied by a photograph of him, the article mentioned that he was the longest serving member of Alderman Newton's and noted his radio appearances and sideline as a "talented detective story writer". It also stated, "At one time he was one of the delegates representing Britain at a NATO study conference in Paris."

The Times published a four-line notice on the 7 November obituary page with no death date. A brief note that Snow subsequently sent to The Times included his estimation of Howard's influence:

He was a remarkable schoolmaster: he was also much more than that. He did not have the luck to get much recognition, but his quality and stature left a mark on all of us who knew him. In our youth most of us owed more to him than to any single man. Certainly I did. He gave us strength and hope and the vision of a desirable life.

== Bibliography ==
- Haycraft, H., ed. (1947). The Art of the Mystery Story: A Collection of Critical Essays. New York: Grosset & Dunlap.
- Halperin, J.; Snow, C. P.; Johnson, P. H. (1983). C.P. Snow, an Oral Biography: Together with a Conversation with Lady Snow (Pamela Hansford Johnson). New York: St. Martin's Press.
- Howard, H. E. (1935). The Eighteenth Century and the Revolution. (1714–1815.). London: Victor Gollancz.
- McKendrick, Neil (2019). Sir John Plumb: The Hidden Life of a Great Historian. Edward Everett Root.
- The Newtonian. Magazine of Alderman Newton's School,.Leicester. 1926–1999.
- James, Frank A. J. L. (2012). "Alfred Rupert Hall 1920–2009; Marie Boas Hall 1919–2009". Biographical Memoirs of Fellows of the British Academy. XI: 353–408.
- Snow, Philip (1982). Stranger and brother: a portrait of C.P. Snow. Macmillan. ISBN 0-333-32680-6.
