= Athenaeum Club, London =

Private club in London, England

Coordinates: 51°30′25″N 0°07′58″W

- Founded: 1824
- Headquarters: 107 Pall Mall, London, England
- Website: theathenaeum.co.uk

The Athenaeum is a private members' club in London, founded in 1824. It is primarily a club for men and women with intellectual interests, and particularly (but not exclusively) for those who have attained some distinction in science, engineering, literature or the arts. Humphry Davy and Michael Faraday were the first chairman and secretary and 51 Nobel Laureates have been members. Its current Chairman is Sir Philip May.

The clubhouse is located at 107 Pall Mall at the corner of Waterloo Place. It was designed by Decimus Burton in the Neoclassical style, and built by the company of Decimus's father, James Burton, the pre-eminent London property developer. Decimus was described by architectural scholar Guy Williams as "the designer and prime member of the Athenaeum, one of London's grandest gentlemens' [sic] clubs".

The clubhouse has a Doric portico, above which is a statue of the classical goddess of wisdom, Athena, from whom the club derives its name. The bas-relief frieze is a copy of the frieze of the Parthenon in Athens. The club's facilities include an extensive library, a dining room known as the coffee room, a Morning Room, a drawing room on the first floor, a restored smoking room (smoking is no longer permitted) on the upper floor, and a suite of bedrooms.

== Foundation ==
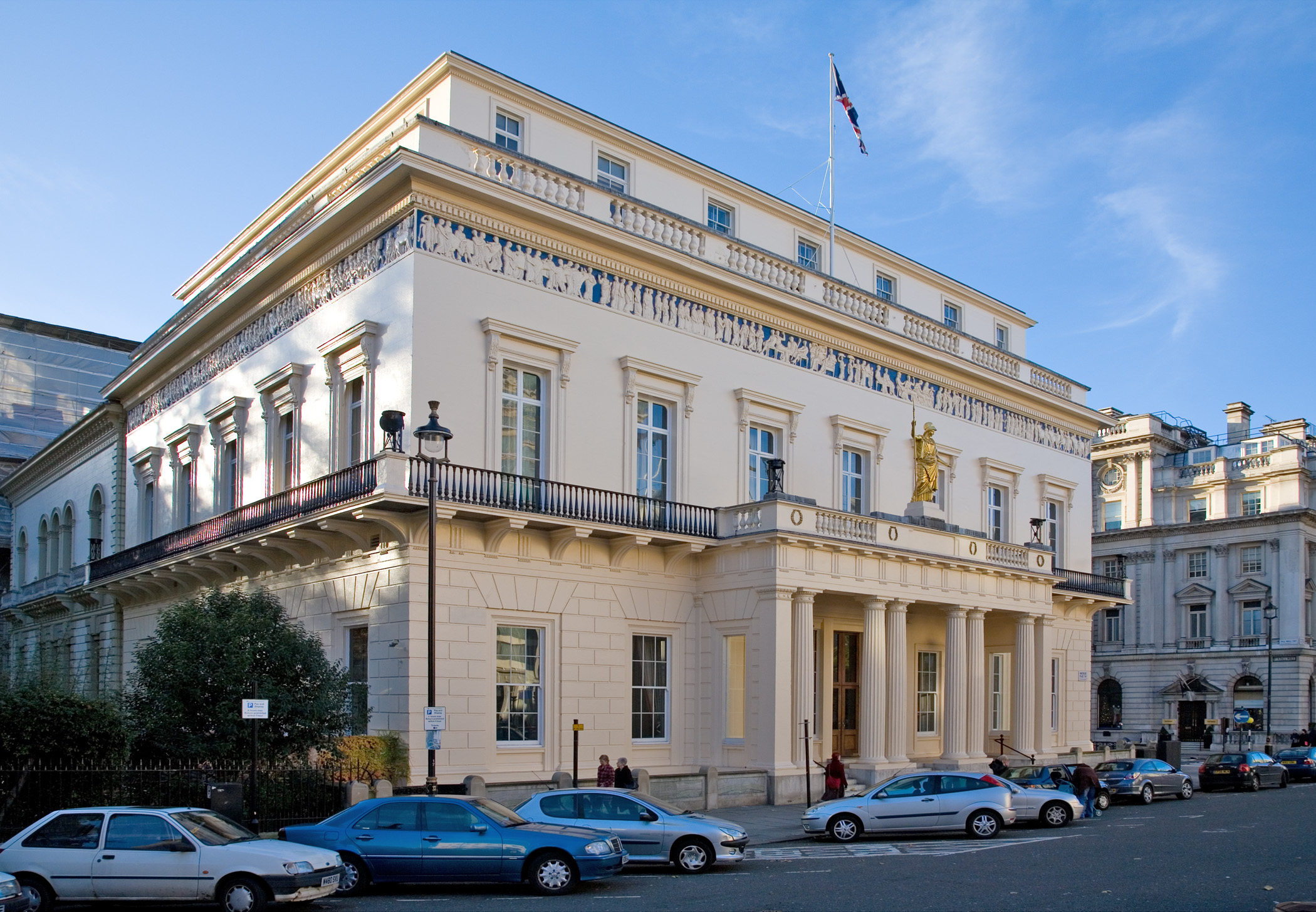
The Athenaeum Club in 2006 viewed from the south-east

The Athenaeum was founded in 1824 at the instigation of John Wilson Croker, then Secretary to the Admiralty, who was largely responsible for the organisation and early development of the club. In 1823, Croker wrote to Sir Humphry Davy,

I will take the opportunity of repeating the proposition I have made to you about a club for literary and scientific men and followers of the fine arts. The fashionable and military clubs... have spoiled all the coffee houses and taverns so that the artist, or mere literary man... are in a much worse position.

Croker suggested 30 names for the club's organising committee, including the Earl of Aberdeen, the Earl of Ashburnham, Earl Spencer, Lord Palmerston, Sir Thomas Lawrence, Francis Chantrey, and Robert Smirke the Younger: all of those invited, except Richard Payne Knight, accepted. The first meeting of the Athenaeum, with 14 men present, was held at the rooms of the Royal Society on 16 February 1824. A Committee was formed, the names being proposed by Croker, who wrote that "all depends on having a committee with a great many good names and a few working hands". A smaller sub-committee was appointed with full powers to do what was necessary to establish the club. It was resolved that there should be 400 members, of whom 300 were to be appointed by the committee and the remainder elected by ballot. Sir Humphry Davy became the first chairman of the club and Michael Faraday the first secretary. Faraday soon found that he could not spare the time required and resigned, though he remained a member of the club. The total number of members was increased to 1,000 by December 1824.

By May 1824 temporary premises had been rented at 12 Waterloo Place, which had been constructed by the company of club member James Burton, the pre-eminent London property developer, whose son Decimus Burton, then 24 years old, was commissioned to design a permanent clubhouse. A site was chosen on the north side of Pall Mall East but was found to be too small. The next proposed site was on the east side of Trafalgar Square, but then the government decided to demolish Carlton House and develop the site and a portion of it was offered to the Athenaeum. The offer was accepted and a long lease was granted by the Crown.

== The Clubhouse ==
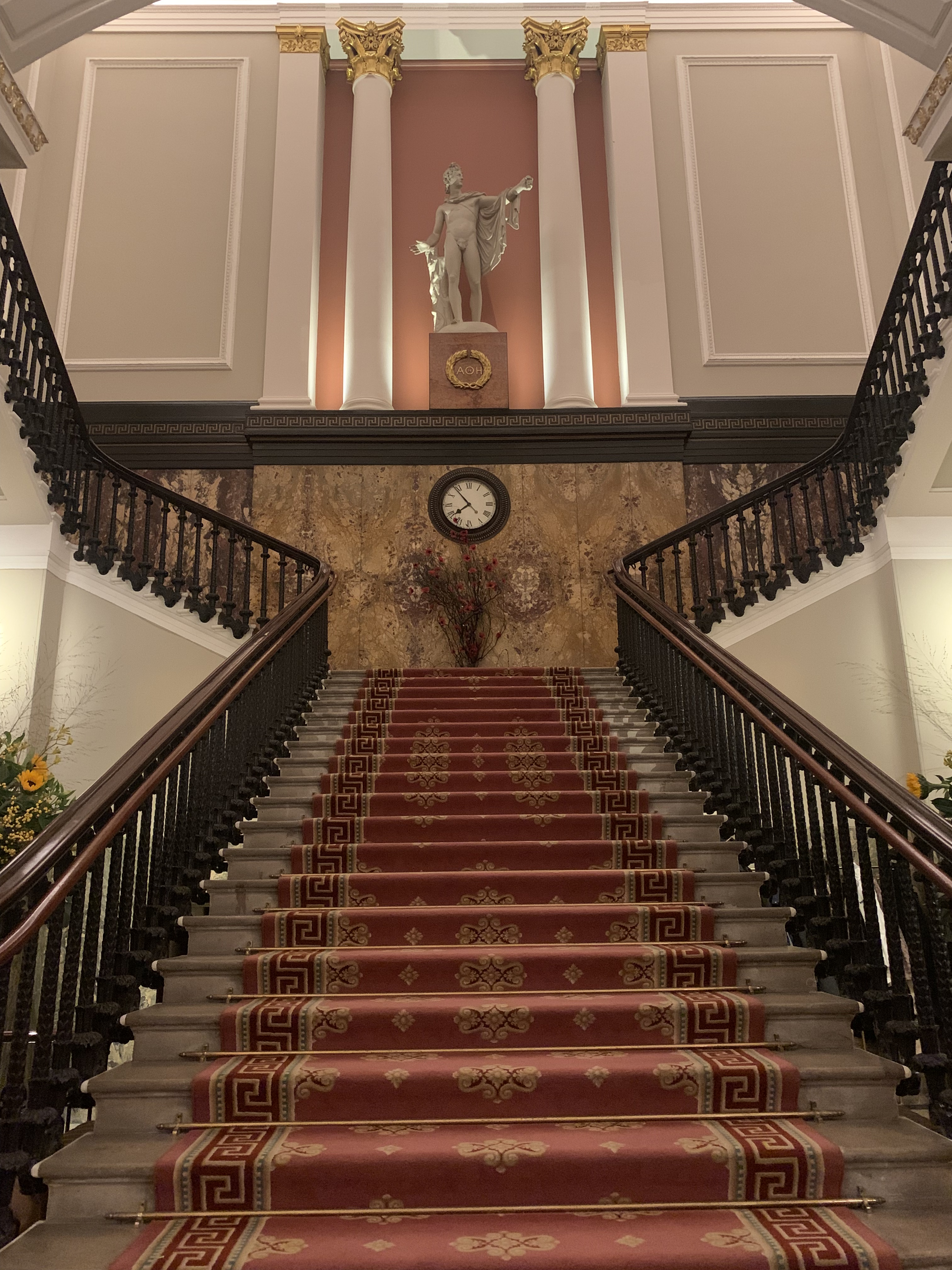
Athenaeum Grand Staircase

Decimus Burton was commissioned to design the clubhouse at 107 Pall Mall, at the corner of Waterloo Place. Despite his young age, Decimus Burton had already designed many notable buildings in London. Burton's clubhouse is in the Neoclassical style, with a Doric portico with paired columns, and has been described by architectural scholar Guy Williams as "a building of remarkable grace and astonishing novelty" with a central staircase that is "distinctly Egyptian in flavour". Burton made himself responsible for the design of as many of the decorative features of the club as possible, including the clock-cases and the pendant light-fittings. When the clubhouse was completed in April 1830, the members of the club committee stated,

[They] are bound to express their entire satisfaction at the manner in which the work has been carried out by Mr. Burton. They can testify, and indeed the foregoing Accounts evince, the general accuracy of his estimates and they trust that the club at large, as well as the public, must be satisfied of his professional skill, and the beauty of his architectural designs.

The original building had two principal storeys; the third and fourth were added at the end of the 19th century.

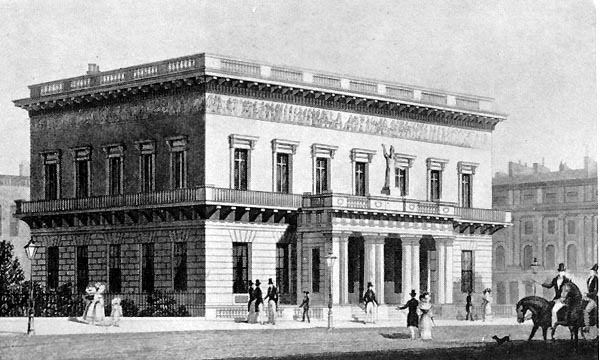
The Athenaeum Club in 1830

There is a continuous balustrade on the first floor, with an outstanding but costly frieze, designed by Decimus Burton and executed by John Henning, a leading sculptor of the day, depicting the Panathenaic procession, a copy of the marbles from the Parthenon in Athens ("The Elgin Marbles", now in the British Museum). Croker, who was much involved in the building of the clubhouse, was determined that it should have the frieze, despite the cost, and resisted pressure from some members (in those pre-refrigeration days) that an ice-house be part of the scheme; leading some wit to compose the rhyme:

I'm John Wilson Croker, I do as I please. Instead of an Ice-House I give you a... Frieze!

The frieze was executed by John Henning at a cost of £1,300. Building works commenced in 1827 and were completed by 1830. The statue of Pallas Athene by Edward Hodges Baily, which stands above the porch, was installed in the same year (the spear was added later). The total cost was £43,101 14s 8d. This exceeded the estimate by £2,226, attributed to the cost of gas fittings and furniture.

The cast of the Apollo Belvedere positioned in the recess at the top of the principal staircase at the Athenaeum was a gift to the club from Decimus Burton. A statue of Demosthenes was first installed there but was speedily removed and replaced by the Apollo. The statues of Venus and Diana on either side of the hall are casts of antique statues in the Louvre in Paris.

== Membership statutes ==
The new building was complete by early 1830 and the first general meeting was held there on 30 May 1830. In the same year the rules of the club were amended by the addition of a new Rule 2, which allowed the Committee to elect each year not more than nine persons "of distinguished eminence in science, literature or the arts". This rule has always been a special feature of the club and, with the addition of the words "or for public service", remains in force today. Ordinary members were elected by ballot (until 1935). The Duke of Wellington was a founding member of the club and the stone installed at his request to assist him in mounting his horse can still be seen on the pavement outside the front porch.

After the completion of the building there was a cash deficit of some £20,000 and in 1832 it was decided to bring in 200 supernumerary members, half selected by the committee and half elected by the club. This restored the finances for the time being, but additional expenditure was soon required to improve the ventilation of the clubhouse and because of recurrent troubles with the gas lighting (it was one of the first buildings to be lit by gas) and it was decided in 1838 to increase the permitted number of members to 1,200, which made it necessary to elect a further 40 members. These became known as the "Forty Thieves" and comprised some very distinguished men including Charles Dickens and Charles Darwin.

The number of members was still 1,200 when Humphry Ward published his history of the club in 1926, but has subsequently been increased to 2,000. There was always a long waiting list in the 19th century and the earlier years of the 20th century.

== Librarians ==
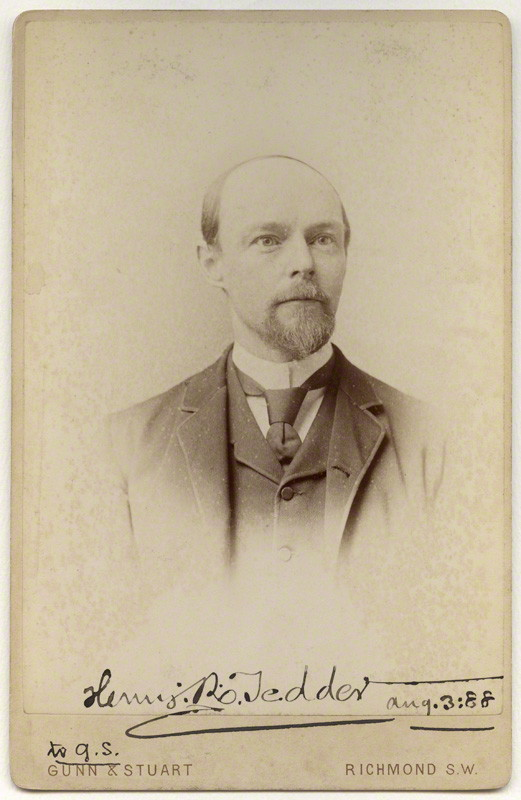
Henry Richard Tedder

The first librarian of the Athenaeum was Spencer Hall, appointed in 1833 on the recommendation of his relative Edward Magrath, who succeeded Michael Faraday as first secretary of the club.

In 1874 Henry Richard Tedder became assistant to Spencer Hall. From 1873 he had been librarian to John Dalberg-Acton, 1st Baron Acton, who was an active member of the club. Hall died in 1875 and Tedder became librarian, and also secretary from 1888. He remained until retirement in 1914.

== Later history to 1914 ==
Originally water was obtained from a well and St Martins pump and also (unsatisfactorily) from the Chelsea Water Works. A proper public supply was connected in 1853 and in 1855 a primitive system of mains drainage was made available, although a fully efficient system did not come until 1885. In 1886 the clubhouse was first lit by electricity, supplied by its own two generators in the basement until connected to a public supply in 1896. The interior of the clubhouse was extensively redecorated in the early 1890s to designs by Sir Lawrence Alma-Tadema and Sir Edward Poynter, both members of the club. The morning room decoration (by Poynter) remains largely unchanged. An electric lift was installed in 1900, replacing an earlier hydraulic lift.

The 3rd principal storey was added to the building in 1898 after more than one earlier proposal had been rejected, largely because the members were not prepared to accept an increase in the subscription. This provided space for a large Smoking Room and other rooms including staff bedrooms. The architect was T.E. Collcutt. In 1899 the small smoking room in the basement was combined with the adjoining Billiards Room to make a larger Billiards Room with two tables.

Early in 1914, the Committee passed a resolution allowing members to invite guests (then limited to two male guests) to dinner in the evening and in the Drawing Room afterwards. Previously, only members could eat in the club.

== History of the Club after 1914 ==
Smoking had been strictly forbidden in the club, except in rooms designated for the purpose, until in 1924 it was allowed after 1.30 pm in the drawing room and in 1928 throughout the club, except in the coffee room (as the main dining room is still designated) and the south library.

In 1927/28 a fourth storey was built to provide bedrooms for members and the third floor, which had previously held staff bedrooms, was adapted to provide members' bedrooms. At the same time a large part of the third floor smoking room was converted into bedrooms and a washroom.

In 1936 the club took a lease of 6 Carlton Gardens, once Gladstone's house, as a ladies' annexe with a dining room and drawing room (where members could invite female guests). This was closed during the Second World War and thereafter (although reopened) it lost its former popularity. The lease expired in 1961 and was not renewed. The Crown refused consent for a new building above the ground, and so a new ladies' annexe was constructed under the garden, incorporating the former billiards room. It was opened in September 1961 with a separate entrance from Waterloo Place, which has an appropriate quotation in Greek from Homer's Odyssey above the door.

As related in the memoirs of David Ben Gurion, Israel's first Prime Minister, on 18 May 1937 he met at the Athenaeum Club with St John Philby, a British official who had converted to Islam and was serving as a senior adviser to King Ibn Saud of Saudi Arabia. For several hours, Ben Gurion and Philby held informal talks there on a draft treaty between the Zionist movement and an Arab Federation headed by Ibn Saud. However, they did not reach agreement on the details.

In 1972, members were permitted to invite women to the coffee room for dinner and to the drawing room afterwards. Later, they were also allowed as guests to lunch. In 2002 the members voted by a large majority to admit women as members on the same terms in all respects as men.

== Founders of the Athenaeum Club ==
1. John Wilson Croker (founder)
2. Sir Humphry Davy (founder, first Chairman)
3. Michael Faraday (founder, first Secretary)
4. Sir Thomas Lawrence (designer of Club seal)
5. Sir Francis Chantrey
6. Henry John Temple, 3rd Viscount Palmerston

=== James and Decimus Burton ===
After the club relocated to its present clubhouse, two members to be admitted were Decimus Burton, the architect of the clubhouse, and his father, James Burton, the pre-eminent London property developer, whose company had constructed the new clubhouse to Decimus's design. The cast of the Apollo Belvedere positioned in the recess at the top of the principal staircase at the Athenaeum was a gift to the club from Decimus. There is a photographic portrait of Decimus, taken in 1873, preserved at the club, and the club retains some furniture designed by Decimus. Another early member was Sir Peter Hesketh-Fleetwood, a close friend of the Burtons.

== Notable members ==
51 members of the club have won the Nobel Prize, including at least one in each category of the prize.

== References to the Club ==
Theodore Hook in the early years of the club (of which he was a member) commenced his light-hearted verse description of the London clubs with these lines:

There's first the Athenaeum Club; so wise there's not a man of it
That has not sense enough for six (in fact that is the plan of it);
The very waiters answer you with eloquence Socratical,
And always place the knives and forks in order mathematical.

In 1853, Charles Manby Smith noted the importance of the club: "from having been wise enough to join the grocer's Plum-pudding Club, they shall end by becoming prosperous enough to join the Whittington Club, or the Gresham Club, or the Athenaeum Club, or the Travellers' Club; or the House of Commons, or the House of Lords either."

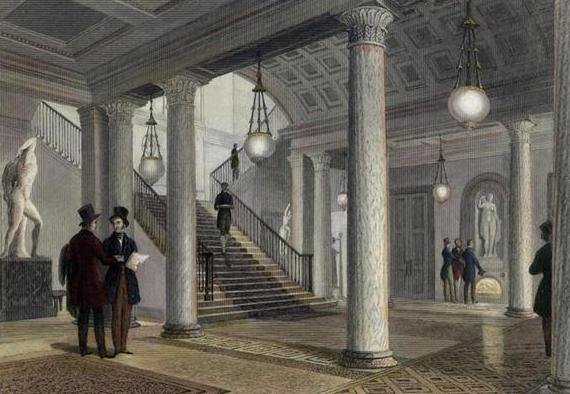
The hall of the club in 1841. The statue of Venus can be seen in its present position on the far wall, but the two statues seen on either side of the staircase were later removed.

In Time of Hope, the first novel of his sequence Strangers and Brothers, C.P. Snow sets part of chapter XLIII in the Athenaeum.

== See also ==
- Liverpool Athenaeum
- Boston Athenæum
- List of London's gentlemen's clubs
