= The Antagonists (Haggard novel) =

1964 novel by William Haggard

First edition (publ. Cassell)

The Antagonists is a 1964 suspense novel by the British author William Haggard published in England by Cassell and in the United States by Ives Washburn. It was Haggard's sixth of 21 books involving his protagonist Colonel Charles Russell, the urbane head of the unobtrusive but lethal Security Executive, a government counter-intelligence agency clearly based on the actual MI5 or Security Service, where he moves easily and gracefully along C. P. Snow's Corridors of Power in Whitehall. Like Haggard's earlier books it has standard elements of suspense thrillers along with detailed examinations of character, but in this case with more scenes of direct action and somewhat less dissection of character and motivation than in the first three books.

== Plot ==
Protagonist is perhaps too strong a word to describe Colonel Russell. As Haggard himself wrote about his fiction:

My novels are chiefly novels of suspense with a background of international politics. A Colonel Charles Russell of the Security Executive, a not entirely imaginary British counter-espionage organization, while not a protagonist in the technical sense, holds the story line together in the background by his operations, while the characters in the foreground carry the action."

As usual with Haggard's books, there are subplots within subplots, but the main theme is a simple one: one of the world's most brilliant scientists, Alexander Gorgan, has been ordered by the President of his native country (unnamed but clearly Yugoslavia) to deliver an address to an eminent group of scientists in London. He is the world's greatest expert in microwaves, which have become vital in the development of anti-ballistic missile defenses. It is a political decision: there are mounting tensions within his country between different groups of Communists, and the Soviets (also unnamed, but clearly identified) are trying to interfere in an unhelpful way. Gorgan is a prize that any of the factions would like to seize (or simply kill), so England, which enjoys friendly relations with Gorgan's President, is seen as being a sanctuary for weeks or even months. And Gorgan's masters have confidence that the Special Branch and Colonel Russell's Security Executive together will be able to secure his safety. Gorgan, however, although a relatively young, hard-living bon vivante, also has a serious neurological issue and he collapses immediately upon arrival in England and is rushed to a private hospital in the countryside where he will spend weeks in fitful recuperation. Seizing this unexpected opportunity, one of the factions immediately makes an attempt on his life but is thwarted by the Security Executive. And now another unforeseen faction appears: Americans, who are nominal allies of the English. Rather than wanting to kill him, at least one of them, an Embassy diplomat and multi-millionaire, merely wants to brainwash him and drain him of his knowledge of microwaves. But Colonel Russell, now aided by the timely reappearance of his "invaluable" aide Major Mortimer from earlier books, enlists the help of James Scobell, an American semi-colleague who clearly works for the unnamed CIA, and with Mortimer and Scobell consulting closely, he arranges an elaborate rescue of Gorgan from a kidnapping contrived to deliver him clandestinely to Russia. At the very end of the book Russell and his ministerial master from earlier books, Gabriel Palliser, are discussing what to do with Gorgan, now arranged by the Yugoslavs to be in England for a long period of time. Sir William Banner, the prominent industrialist from the previous High Wire, is proposed as being a possible patron. Russell agrees but says firmly: "We mustn't cheat." And the Minister replies: "We mustn't be caught out cheating."
