= You Can't Win =

You Can't Win may refer to:

- "You Can't Win" (song), a song by Michael Jackson from the film The Wiz
- You Can't Win (album), an album by Dolorean, or the title song
- "You Can't Win", a song by Iron Butterfly from Heavy
- "You Can't Win", a song by Kelly Clarkson from Stronger
- "You Can't Win", a song by Tomahawk from Mit Gas
- You Can't Win (book), a 1926 autobiography by Jack Black
- You Can't Win (1961 TV series), a UK anthology series featuring Donald Tandy in one installment
- You Can't Win (TV series), a UK series based on the novels of William Cooper
- You Can't Win (1948 film), a film nominated for the 1948 Academy Award for Best Live Action Short Film
- You Can't Win, a 1970 story of The Railway Series book Duke the Lost Engine

== See also ==
- "Can't Win", a song by Richard Thompson from Amnesia
