= The Unquiet Sleep =

1962 British suspense novel

First edition (UK)

The Unquiet Sleep is a 1962 suspense novel by British author William Haggard which was published in England by Cassell and in the United States by Ives Washburn. It is the 4th novel in a series of 21 books that involve urbane protagonist, Colonel Charles Russell. Russel is the head of the Security Executive, a government counterintelligence agency based on the actual MI5 or Security Service. He moves easily and gracefully along C. P. Snow's Corridors of Power in Whitehall. As in Haggard's earlier books, it has the standard elements of a suspense thriller along with detailed examinations of character, but with more scenes of direct action and somewhat less dissection of character and motivation from the first three books.

== Plot ==
"Protagonist" is perhaps too strong a word to describe Colonel Russell. As Haggard himself wrote about his work:

"My novels are chiefly novels of suspense with a background of international politics. Colonel Charles Russell of the Security Executive, a not entirely imaginary British counter-espionage organization, while not a protagonist in the technical sense, holds the storyline together in the background by his operations, while the characters in the foreground carry the action."

A leading British pharmaceutical company has released a new tranquilizer, Mecron, which has very positive and pleasing effects on its users and sells well as a result. Henry Leggatt, a former board member of the company and Member of Parliament, works as Parliamentary Secretary to Robert Seneschal, the Minister of Social Welfare, who thinks that he should rightfully be prime minister. Leggatt is aware that there may be dangerous, unintended side-effects to Mecron, and he and his supervisor take steps to ensure the drug is withdrawn from the market until conclusive studies have been carried out. However, a disgruntled underling discloses this to a notorious newspaper and Mecron immediately becomes a scandalous public issue. In this, the fourth book of the series, Colonel Russell of the Security Executive is without his "invaluable" aide, Major Mortimer, and suffers from a lack of consultations with his Minister, Gabriel Palliser, the Home Office Secretary. Palliser is alerted to the fact that a lucrative black market that sells small quantities of the now-illicit drug has quickly blossomed.

A beautiful young French woman, Rachel Borrodaile, is Colonel Russell's chosen operative for this book. She was in the French Resistance during World War II, where she knew Henry Leggatt, who had served in the British forces. Captured by the Gestapo, she was severely tortured and hospitalized for two years. After making a full recovery, she has become a highly trained and very dangerous British operative and is given carte blanche by Russell to do whatever is necessary to shut down the black market. A small gang of ruthless Cypriots, already known to the police, has secured a supply of Mecron. Whilst their chemist in Turkey attempts to duplicate the drug, they kidnap and torture Henry Leggatt, with the hope that he will lead them to the stockpiled supplies at his former pharmaceutical company. Borrodaile, having recently renewed her friendship with Leggatt after 16 years, becomes determined to thwart the Cypriots. By the time the story comes to Haggard's usual violent dénouement, the originally quiet investigation into the side-effects of a drug has had a profound effect on the lives of all the story's characters except for Colonel Russell.

== Reception and/or Appraisal ==
Reviews were favorable:

The New York Times: With all the recent controversy over the side-effects of such drugs as Percodan, Enovid, and thalidomide, the theme of William Haggard's THE UNQUIET SLEEP (Washburn, $3.50) is unusually timely. Evidence indicates that a new tranquilizer, Mecron, is probably addictive. One of Her Majesty's Secretaries is connected with the company manufacturing Mecron—which makes for political intrigues and scandal. A Cypriot black-market gang wants to exploit the new addicts and only Col. Charles Russell of the Security Executive can cope with all the resultant complications. Haggard may prove a little intricate for the hasty reader, but will richly reward the discriminating.

Kirkus Reviews: The evidence that a new tranquillizer is addictive threatens not only the Ministry of Social Welfare but one of its members, Leggatt, a former director of the firm now distributing it. Col. Russell of Security and his fearless, attractive assistant Rachel are assigned to check the continuing availability of the drug on the black market, and traffic which leads to murder. There's a sotto voce romance as well. Brisk, literate excitement.
