= George Passant =

1960 novel by C.P. Snow

- First edition (original title)
- Author: C. P. Snow
- Language: English
- Series: Strangers and Brothers
- Genre: Political fiction
- Publisher: Macmillan Publishers
- Publication date: December 1940
- Publication place: United Kingdom
- Media type: Print (Hardcover and Paperback)
- Pages: 320pp
- ISBN: 0-333-04721-4 (hardcover edition)
- OCLC: 12616695
- Preceded by: Time of Hope (reading order)
- Followed by: The Light and the Dark (published order); The Conscience of the Rich (reading order)

George Passant is the first published of C. P. Snow's series of novels Strangers and Brothers, but the second according to the internal chronology. It was first published under the name Strangers and Brothers. It was published in the United Kingdom in 1940 and in the U.S. in 1960.

== Plot synopsis ==
George Passant is a solicitor in a small English town, whose idealism and eccentricity lead him to accumulate a group of young followers in a mentor-like capacity. Narrated by Lewis Eliot, the novel has the more general background of Eliot's rising career and the changes in English society through the 20th century.

Snow has acknowledged that the Passant character was patterned after his schoolmaster friend in Leicester, Herbert Edmund Howard.

== Reception ==
In a 1960 book review in Kirkus Reviews, the book was called a "slowly, closely pursued examination and rationale and an enlightened discussion of questions of conscience and conduct and commitment. And as such, if within a narrower margin, it is filled with the concerns which are so fundamentally and essentially a part of this writer's work and have attracted a firm following."

== Adaptation ==
The novel was adapted for the television series Strangers and Brothers, which started Shaughan Seymour as Lewis Eliot and Tom Wilkinson as George Passant.
