= William Haggard =

British writer

William Haggard (born Croydon 11 August 1907, died Frinton-on-Sea 27 October 1993) was the pseudonym of Richard Henry Michael Clayton, the son of the Rev. Henry James Clayton and Mabel Sarah Clayton. He was an English writer of fictional spy thrillers set in the 1960s through the 1980s, or, as the writer H. R. F. Keating called them, "action novels of international power." Like C. P. Snow, he was a quintessentially British Establishment figure who had been a civil servant in India, and his books vigorously put forth his perhaps idiosyncratic points of view. The principal character in most of his novels is the urbane Colonel Charles Russell of the fictional Security Executive, (clearly based on the actual MI5 or Security Service), who moves easily and gracefully along Snow's Corridors of Power in Whitehall. During the years of the fictional spy mania initially begun by the James Bond stories, Haggard was considered by most critics to be at the very top of the field.

Keating, however, also observes that "...the books were fore-runners in a trend that was noticeable in both British and American crime writing from the late 1960's onwards, a turning of the tide to flow to the right. After the revolution carried out in the late 1930s by Eric Ambler in the espionage field... a revolution which swung crime writing generally to the left... there had been little change. With the Haggard books the first signs of a silent swing began to show."

Writing about his fiction, Haggard himself said:

My novels are chiefly novels of suspense with a background of international politics. A Colonel Charles Russell of the Security Executive, a not entirely imaginary British counter-espionage organization, while not a protagonist in the technical sense, holds the story line together in the background by his operations, while the characters in the foreground carry the action."

== Life ==
Born in Croydon, Surrey, Haggard was educated at Lancing College and received his B.A. from Christ Church, Oxford. He entered the Indian Civil Service and eventually became a judge. He was then on the General Staff in the Indian Army from 1939 to 1946, at least part of the time as an intelligence officer, rising to Lieutenant Colonel. He obtained a M.A. from Oxford University in 1947 and served on the Board of Trade from 1947 to 1969, from 1965 to 1969 being the Controller of Enemy Property. He married Barbara Myfanwy Sant in 1936; they had one son and one daughter. Haggard's writing career began in 1958 with the publication of his first novel, Slow Burner. He chose his nom de plume from his mother's maiden name, Haggard; she was said to be a distant relative of the well-known Victorian adventure writer H. Rider Haggard.

== Books ==
=== Colonel Charles Russell series ===
1. Slow Burner (1958)
2. Venetian Blind (1959)
3. The Arena (1961)
4. The Unquiet Sleep (1962)
5. The High Wire (1963)
6. The Antagonists (1964)
7. The Powder Barrel (1965)
8. The Hard Sell (1965)
9. The Power House (1966)
10. The Conspirators (1967)
11. A Cool Day for Killing (1968)
12. The Hardliners (1970)
13. The Bitter Harvest (1971) aka Too Many Enemies
14. The Old Masters (1973) aka The Notch on the Knife
15. The Scorpion's Tail (1975)
16. Yesterday's Enemy (1976)
17. The Poison People (1977)
18. Visa to Limbo (1978)
19. The Median Line (1979)
20. The Money Men (1981)
21. The Mischief Makers (1982)
22. The Heirloom (1983)
23. The Need To Know (1984)
24. The Meritocrats (1985)
25. The Vendettists (1990)

=== Paul Martiny series ===
1. The Protectors (1972)
2. The Kinsmen (1974)

=== William Wilberforce Smith series ===
1. The Martello Tower (1986)
2. The Diplomatist (1987)

=== Other novels ===
- The Telemann Touch (1958)
- Closed Circuit (1960)
- The Doubtful Disciple (1969)
- The Expatriates (1989)

== Sources ==
- Encyclopedia of Mystery and Detection, Chris Steinbrunner and Otto Penzler, McGraw-Hill Book Company, New York, 1976, ISBN 0-07-061121-1
- Twentieth Century Crime and Mystery Writers, edited by John M. Reilly, St. Martins Press, New York, 1980, ISBN 0-312-82417-3
- Who's Who in Spy Fiction, Donald McCormick, Sphere Books Limited, London, 1979
