= The Affair (play) =

1962 play by Ronald Millar

- Original language: English
- Written by: Ronald Millar
- Based on: The Affair by C. P. Snow
- Setting: Cambridge and London

Premiere
- Date: September 20, 1962
- Place: Henry Miller Theatre, New York City

The Affair is a 1962 play by Ronald Millar based on the novel by C. P. Snow.

This novel was also adapted for Australian TV in 1965.

== Synopsis ==
A group of professors at Cambridge University try to hire an old colleague back even though they all don't like him, they all agree he was dismissed unfairly.

== Productions ==
The original production premiered on September 20, 1962 at Henry Miller Theatre and closed after 116 performances on December 29, 1962. The show was directed by John Fernald, scenery and lighting design by Eldon Elder, and costume design by Ramse Mostoller.

The cast starred Kynaston Reeves (Thomas Crawford), Christopher Hewett (Tom Orbell), Brewster Mason (Sir Lewis Eliot), Brenda Vaccaro (Laura Howard), Kenneth Mars (Martin Eliot), Francis Compton (G.H. Winslow), Edward Atienza (M. H. L. Gay), Donald Moffat (Julian Skeffington), Geoffrey Lumsden (Sir Francis Getliffe), Edgar Daniels (Arthur Brown), Patrick Waddington (Alec Nightingale), Elizabeth Hubbard (Margaret Eliot), Keith Baxter (Donald Howard), and Paxton Whitehead (Gilbert Dawson-Hill).

== Sources ==
- 1963. The Burns Mantle Yearbook: The Best Plays of 1962-1963 New York, NY: Dodd, Mead, & Company.
