= The Affair (Snow novel) =

1960 novel by C. P. Snow

- First edition
- Author: C. P. Snow
- Language: English
- Series: Strangers and Brothers
- Publisher: Macmillan
- Publication date: 1960
- Publication place: United Kingdom
- Media type: Print
- Preceded by: Homecomings
- Followed by: Corridors of Power

The Affair is the eighth book in C. P. Snow's Strangers and Brothers series. The events return to the Cambridge college of The Masters. It is once again narrated by Lewis Eliot.

== Plot synopsis ==
An unpopular academic, Dr Donald Howard, is dismissed from the college for fraud. Doubt soon arises as to the evidence and the fellows are divided into two camps, those who are reluctant to reopen the case and others who override the board. Eliot handles the defence in the proceedings.

== Reception ==
In a 1960 book review in Kirkus Reviews called the book "[the] one in which Mr. Snow's special talents have their best application... It is a scrupulous, equable, stimulating, passionless examination of human conduct—and C.P. Snow's considered almost flat prose is often deceptive so subtle are many of the intentions and revelations which ensue. His audience by now is most secure." Michael Millgate, writing for Commentary Magazine, wrote the book "does not have quite the claustrophobic intensity of [The Masters]; but to look for these things in The Affair to the extent that they are present in The Masters is to misunderstand what Snow is about... the action is sufficiently compelling, both in its psychological complexity and its narrative excitement, to enable the book to stand firmly alone in its own right. But to be fully understood and appreciated The Affair needs to be read in the context of the whole Strangers and Brothers sequence.

== Adaptations ==
The novel was adapted as a 1962 play by Ronald Millar and also adapted as a television play for Australian TV in 1965. It was adapted for the BBC Sunday-Night Play with John Clements as Eliot and Alan Dobie as Howard. Cyril Luckham, who had played Eustace Pilbrow in the television series Strangers and Brothers plays Francis Getliffe. In the 1984 BBC series, Paul Hastings played Francis Getliffe.
