= John H. Plumb =

British historian (1911–2001)

Sir John H. Plumb FSA FRSL FRHistS FBA
- Born: John Harold Plumb; 20 August 1911; Leicester, England
- Died: 21 October 2001 (age 90); Cambridge, England

Academic background
- Education: University College, Leicester; Christ's College, Cambridge
- Thesis: Elections to the House of Commons in the Reign of William III (1936)
- Doctoral advisor: G. M. Trevelyan

Academic work
- Discipline: History
- Institutions: King's College, Cambridge; Christ's College, Cambridge; Columbia University; Washington University in St. Louis
- Notable students: Roy Porter; Simon Schama; Linda Colley; David Cannadine; Quentin Skinner; Clive Holmes; Neil McKendrick
- Main interests: Eighteenth century, British history

Sir John (Jack) Harold Plumb FSA FRSL FRHistS FBA (20 August 1911 – 21 October 2001) was a British historian and Master of Christ's College, Cambridge, known for his books on British 18th-century history.

== Background ==
Christ's College, Cambridge

Plumb was born in Leicester on 20 August 1911, the third son of James Plumb. He was educated at Alderman Newton's School, Leicester, where he came under the influence of the history teacher H.E. Howard. He next read History at University College, Leicester (BA Lond. 1933) and finally at Christ's College, Cambridge (PhD 1936). His doctoral thesis, on the social structure of the House of Commons at the time of William III, was supervised by G. M. Trevelyan, the only time that Trevelyan is believed to have taken on that role. In 1939, Plumb was elected to the Ehrman Fellowship, which was a research fellowship at King's College, Cambridge.

== Career ==
During the Second World War, Plumb worked in the codebreaking department of the Foreign Office at Bletchley Park, Hut 8 and Hut 4, later Block B. He headed a section working on a German Navy hand cipher, Reservehandverfahren.

In 1946, he became a Fellow and Tutor of Christ's College and a University Lecturer in History. He served as Steward from 1948 to 1950, Tutor from 1950 to 1959, and as Vice-Master from 1964 until 1968.

In 1962, he was appointed Reader in Modern English History, becoming Professor of Modern British History in the University in 1966, and was Chair of the History Faculty from 1966 to 1968. He retired as Professor in 1974. He served as Master of Christ's College from 1978 to 1982.

He was invited to deliver lectures including the Ford Lectures at the University of Oxford in 1965–66, the Saposnekov Lectures at the City College of New York in 1968, the Guy Stanton Ford Lecture at the University of Minnesota in 1969, the Stenton Lecture at the University of Reading in 1972, and the George Rogers Clark Lecture of the Society of the Cincinnati in 1977.

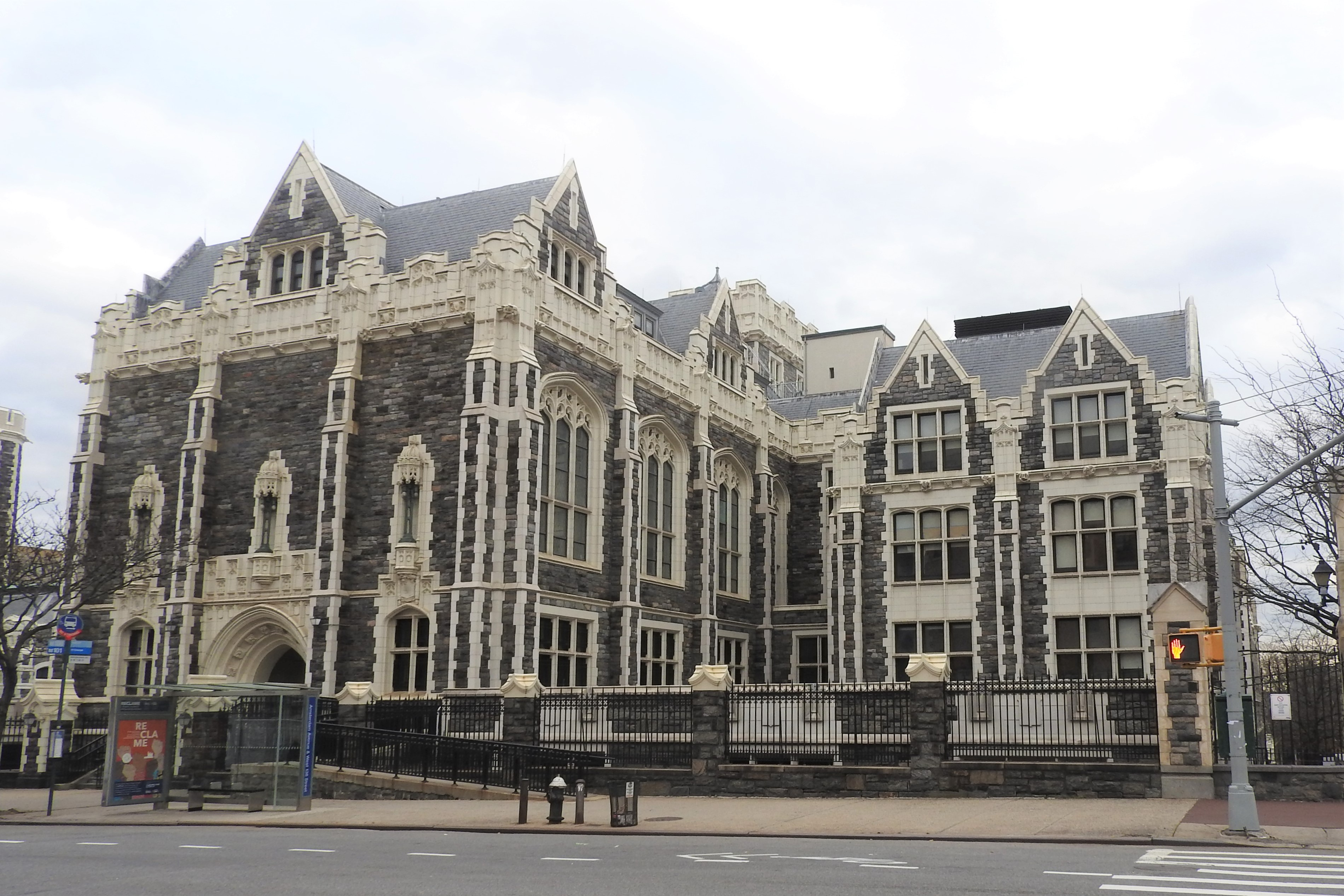
New York City University

He held a visiting professorship at Columbia University in 1960, and other appointments including Distinguished Visiting Professor at New York City University in 1971–72 and 1976, the Cecil and Ida Green Honors Chair at the Texas Christian University in 1974, and Lewin Visiting Professor at Washington University in St. Louis in 1977.

National Portrait Gallery, London

Plumb also served as trustee for the National Portrait Gallery from 1961 until 1982, was a Syndic of the Fitzwilliam Museum from 1960 until 1977 then trustee from 1985 until 1992. He was also a Council Member of the British Academy from 1977 until 1980 and Chairman of the Centre of East Anglian Studies at the University of East Anglia from 1979 to 1982. He was a trustee of the Wolfson Foundation and Chairman of the British Institute of America from 1982 to 1990.

Plumb's taste for fine dining was illustrated by his service as a Member of the Wine Standards Board from 1973 until 1975. He was a Founder Member of the Bordeaux Society, continuing his membership for fifty years, and was elected a Member of the exclusive dining circle, the Saintsbury Club. He was elected to Brooks's in 1972.

Plumb was the European Advisory Editor for Horizon, and the advisory editor for history for Penguin Books. In the 1960s he branched out as an editor, notably working on The History of Human Society and the Fontana History of Europe series. Contributors to his books included other well-known historians like Morris Bishop, Jacob Bronowski, and Maria Bellonci. Later Plumb worked with Huw Wheldon on the BBC television series Royal Heritage about the British Royal family and the Royal Collections first broadcast in 1977.

An obituary in the New York Times observed that from the 23 books that he wrote between 1950 and 1973, Plumb became wealthy enough to "indulge his taste for fine food and wine;" to build a collection of rare porcelain; to drive a Rolls-Royce; and to live in a "16th-century rectory in Suffolk, a mill in the south of France and a Manhattan pied-à-terre in the Carlyle Hotel."

== Honours ==
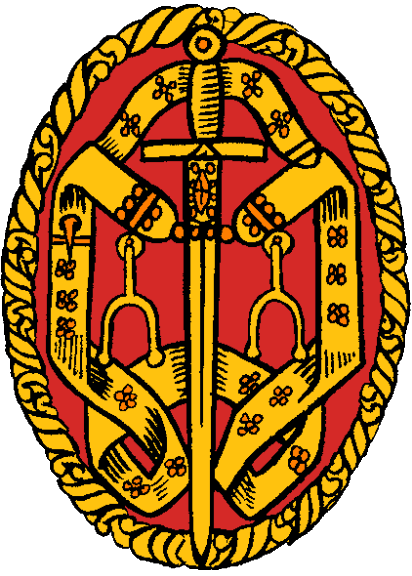
Insignia of a Knight Bachelor

In 1957, Plumb was awarded the honorary degree of Doctor of Letters, by the University of Cambridge, for his work on 18th-century history. He was also granted a DLitt by the University of Leicester in 1968, University of East Anglia in 1973, Bowdoin College, Brunswick in 1974, the University of Southern California in 1978, Westminster College in 1983, also Washington University in St Louis in 1983 and Bard College, New York in 1988.

He was elected a Fellow of the Royal Historical Society, Fellow of the Society of Antiquaries of London, Fellow of the Royal Society of Literature, and Fellow of the British Academy in 1968. He was also elected an Honorary Foreign Member of the American Academy of Arts and Sciences in 1970, Honorary Member of the Society of American Historians in 1976; and Honorary Member of the American Historical Association in 1981. He was knighted in the 1982 Birthday Honours.

== Influence ==
Plumb is seen as mentor to a school of historians, having in common a wish to write accessible, broad-based work for the public: a generation of scholars that includes Roy Porter, Simon Schama, Linda Colley, David Cannadine and others who came to prominence in the 1990s. He was champion of a 'social history' in a wide sense; he backed this up with a connoisseur's knowledge of some fields of the fine arts, such as Flemish painting and porcelain. This approach rubbed off on those he influenced, while he clashed unrepentantly with other historians (notably Cambridge colleague Geoffrey Elton) with a perspective from constitutional history whose emphasis was on more traditional scholarship.

Friends from his early life, C. P. Snow and William Cooper, portrayed him in novels; he also is known to be the model for a character in an Angus Wilson short story The Wrong Set.

== Select Bibliography ==
- Plumb, J.H. (1936), Fifty Years of 'Equity Shoemaking': A History of the Leicester Co-Operative Boot and Shoe Manufacturing Society Ltd, Leicester.
- Plumb, J.H. (1950), England in the Eighteenth Century, London: Pelican, ISBN 0-14-020231-5.
- Plumb, J.H. (1953), Chatham, London: Collins.
- Plumb, J.H., ed. (1955), Studies in Social History: A Tribute to G. M. Trevelyan, London: Longmans.
- Plumb, J.H. (1956), The First Four Georges, London: Penguin, ISBN 978-0141390031.
- Plumb, J.H. (1956), Sir Robert Walpole: I: The Making of a Statesman, London.
- Plumb, J.H. (1960), Sir Robert Walpole: II: The King's Minister, London.
- Plumb, J.H. (1961), The Italian Renaissance, New York: American Heritage, ISBN 0-618-12738-0.
- Plumb, J.H. (1963), Men And Places, ISBN 978-0248984096.
- Plumb, J.H., ed. (1964), Crisis in the Humanities, Harmondsworth: Penguin (responses to Snow's Two Cultures).
- Plumb, J.H. (1967), The Growth of Political Stability in England 1675–1725, London: Palgrave Macmillan, ISBN 978-0333230619.
- Plumb, J.H. (1969), The Death of the Past, London: Palgrave Macmillan, ISBN 978-1403906984.
- Plumb, J.H. (1972), In The Light of History, London: Penguin, ISBN 978-0713902914.
- Plumb, J.H. (1974), The Commercialization of Leisure in Eighteenth Century England, Reading: University of Reading, ISBN 9780704902039.
- Plumb, J.H. (1977), Royal Heritage: The Treasure of the British Crown, London: BBC, ISBN 9780151790111.
- Plumb, J.H. (1978), New Light on the Tyrant George III, Society of the Cincinnati.
- Plumb, J.H., Georgian Delights, London: Weidenfeld & Nicolson, ISBN 978-0297777205.
- Plumb, J.H. (1980), Royal Heritage: The Reign of Elizabeth II, London: Peerage, ISBN 978-0907408796.
- McKendrick, N.; Brewer, J.; Plumb, J.H. (1982), The Birth of a Consumer Society: Commercialization of Eighteenth Century England, London: Harper Collins, ISBN 978-0091548612.
- Plumb, J.H. (1988), Collected Essays: I: The Making of a Historian, New Jersey: Prentice-Hall, ISBN 978-0710812537.
- Plumb, J.H. (1989), Collected Essays: II: The American Experience, New Jersey: Prentice-Hall, ISBN 978-0710812544.

Festschrift:

- McKendrick, N. (1974), Historical Perspectives: Essays in Honour of J. H. Plumb, London: Taylor & Francis, ISBN 9780900362774.

== Sources ==
- Black, Jeremy, "Plumb, J.H." in Kelly Boyd, ed. (1999). Encyclopedia of Historians and Historical Writing, vol 2. Taylor & Francis. pp. 926–7. ISBN 9781884964336.
- Cannadine, David (2002), "Sir John Plumb", History Today, 52
- Cannadine, David (2004), "John Harold Plumb 1911–2001", Proceedings of the British Academy, 124: 268–309
- Neil McKendrick's obituary in the Guardian:
- Simon Schama's obituary in the Independent:

Academic offices
| Preceded by Lord Todd | Master of Christ's College, Cambridge; 1978–1982 | Succeeded by Hans Kornberg |
