= Venetian Blind (novel) =

Novel by William Haggard

First edition (UK)

Venetian Blind is a 1959 suspense novel by the British author William Haggard published in England by Cassell and in the United States by Ives Washburn. It was Haggard's second of 21 books involving his urbane protagonist Colonel Charles Russell, the head of the unobtrusive but lethal Security Executive, a government counter-intelligence agency clearly based on the actual MI5 or Security Service, where he moves easily and gracefully along C. P. Snow's Corridors of Power in Whitehall. Like all of Haggard's books it has standard elements of suspense thrillers but in addition there is an almost Henry Jamiesian exposition of British establishment mores and character, in both the government and in the world of upper-class financiers, scientists, industrialists, their families, and hangers-on, making it very much a novel of character.

== Plot ==
Protagonist is perhaps too strong a word to describe Colonel Russell. As Haggard himself wrote about his fiction:

My novels are chiefly novels of suspense with a background of international politics. A Colonel Charles Russell of the Security Executive, a not entirely imaginary British counter-espionage organization, while not a protagonist in the technical sense, holds the story line together in the background by his operations, while the characters in the foreground carry the action."

Like Haggard's first book, Slow Burner, which involved the exploitation of a fictional nuclear power source, the events in Venetian Blind turn on the development of another notion from science fiction, "negative gravity". Gervas Leat, a rich and imperious Englishman with a second home in Venice and a beautiful Venetian step-daughter who is hostess to his English manor, is working on negative gravity in two of his otherwise highly profitable factories. Through his ties with a minor figure from Slow Burner, a Professor Wasserman, Colonel Russell learns that leaks regarding the highly secret work on negative gravity have been making their way to a rival firm in Germany for several years now. A world-class physicist become a wealthy industrialist, Wasserman is at home in both upper-class English society and German engineering works. Russell works mostly in the book's background to identify the traitor, helped by Richard Wakeley, a relatively young but very accomplished lawyer who is being considered by the government as a possible replacement for the soon-to-retire Russell. Much of the book is an examination of the complicated, even tortured relationships between Wakeley, Gervas Leat, Leat's step-daughter, the occasionally deliberately self-caricaturing Professor Wasserman, and a disaffected assistant to Leat whose wife is one of Leat's many conquests. Upper-class dinners, clubs, and government offices figure conspicuously as the plot advances from the English countryside to the heart of Venice. Only Colonel Russell is exactly what he seems to be on the surface and, as in Slow Burner, the final, violent dénouement finds him more of a bemused spectator than an active participant.

== Reception ==
Reviews were mixed:

Christopher Pym, The Spectator, date unknown: A sad falling-off after Mr. Haggard's admirable first attempt with Slow Burner.

The New York Times: In VENETIAN BLIND (Washburn, $2.95), William Haggard effectively draws a larger-than-life engineer-tycoon, a modern magnifico who lives in the grand manner unoppressed by codes and conventions. When such a man is concerned in the British quest for negative gravity, the problems of the Security Executive are obviously acute. International malefactions and private motives for murder combine to make a quiet, colorful, intelligent thriller.

Anthony Cronin, Times Literary Supplement, date unknown: (I)ts worst fault is that it is one of those smart thrillers which exude self-satisfaction about their milieu — in this case cabinet level top-security and millionaire industrialist high-life — and treat the reader as a sort of gawking poor relation. The plot is mildly ingenious but highly improbable.

Kirkus Reviews:The ramifications of a search for security leaks bring barrister Wakeley into the official orbit that is circling give-aways on "Negative Gravity", take him from England to Venice, and prove he is not perfectly equipped for the job. But it does prove the loyalty of suspected persons, the recent qualities of conscious treason, and the unexpected intricacies of Wakeley's own personal life.
