= Homecomings (novel) =

1956 novel by C. P. Snow

- First edition (UK)
- Author: C. P. Snow
- Language: English
- Series: Strangers and Brothers
- Publisher: Macmillan Publishers (UK); Charles Scribner's Sons (US)
- Publication date: 1956
- Publication place: United Kingdom
- Media type: Print
- Preceded by: The New Men
- Followed by: The Affair

Homecomings is the seventh book in C. P. Snow's Strangers and Brothers series. The events concern the personal life of narrator Lewis Eliot.

== Plot synopsis ==
Following his wife's death, Eliot begins seeing Margaret. Her subsequent, and unsuccessful, marriage to another man leads to a difficult affair.

== Reception ==
In a 1956 book review in Kirkus Reviews summarized the book as "An inordinately objective observer, C. P. Snow's leisurely narrative has a cumulative validity; it is also impressive in its breadth and control."

== Adaptation ==
The novel was adapted for television in the series Strangers and Brothers, which starred Shaughan Seymour as Lewis Eliot and Cherie Lunghi as Margaret Eliot.
