= Slow Burner =

Suspense novel

Slow Burner is a 1958 suspense novel by the British author William Haggard published in England by Cassell and in the United States by Little Brown. It was Haggard's first novel and the first of many involving his protagonist Colonel Charles Russell, the head of the urbane unobtrusive but lethal Security Executive, a government counter-intelligence agency clearly based on the actual MI5 or Security Service, who moves easily and gracefully along C. P. Snow's Corridors of Power in Whitehall. Like most of the other works by Haggard and some by his near contemporaries Victor Canning and Michael Gilbert, it is both a standard novel of suspense and a semi-political thriller about the reactions of those in high government positions who scent potential danger to their own political standing from the on-going events of the novel.

== Plot ==
Protagonist is perhaps too strong a word to describe Colonel Russell. As Haggard himself wrote about his fiction:

My novels are chiefly novels of suspense with a background of international politics. A Colonel Charles Russell of the Security Executive, a not entirely imaginary British counter-espionage organization, while not a protagonist in the technical sense, holds the story line together in the background by his operations, while the characters in the foreground carry the action."

Nuclear Development, a British agency headed by a top scientist named William Nichol, has developed a valuable new source of atomic power called Slow Burner. Very small quantities of it can generate vast amounts of power, and, rather than needing enormous industrial plants to contain it once developed, useful quantities can be carried about in containers no larger than a suitcase. Unless properly handled, however, it emits deadly epsilon rays. It has, nevertheless, recently been successfully installed in a number of English factories and is now considered by the British Government to be a vital part of the country's future. Nichol and Colonel Russell of the Security Executive are surprised and upset to be informed by Sir Jeremy Bates, a very senior Permanent Secretary, that intermittent readings of epsilon rays are being detected as coming from a modest private home in the London suburb of Dipley. Nichol and Russell are old friends, but Nichol is detested by Sir Jeremy, primarily from jealousy, and much of the book, rather than becoming a standard suspense thriller, is devoted to detailed examinations of the feelings and motivations of the two men. A third personality, a senior scientist who works under Nichol, is discovered by the Security Executive to be the probable person to have planted the epsilon-ray emitter in the house, but Sir Jeremy, for complicated reasons of his own, refuses to move against him. Sir Jeremy, in fact, we now see gradually losing his mind from his all-consuming hatred of William Nichol, and eventually there are two different attempts at murder. Russell is both a highly skilled and highly ethical head of his department and carries out his investigations with dispatch and intelligence but, also having an inbred fear of over-suspicion, he finds himself on the wrong side of the argument with his chief assistant, Major Mortimer, about several essential events. In the end, however, he cheerfully concludes that he himself was wrong and that Mortimer was right—an important indication of just why Charles Russell is the perfect man to be holding down his key position in the government.
