= Last Things (novel) =

Novel by C. P. Snow

- First edition
- Author: C. P. Snow
- Language: English
- Series: Strangers and Brothers
- Genre: Political fiction
- Publisher: Macmillan Publishers
- Publication date: 1970
- Publication place: United Kingdom
- Media type: Print (hardback and paperback)
- Preceded by: The Sleep of Reason

Last Things is the eleventh and final installment of C. P. Snow's series of novels Strangers and Brothers.

== Plot synopsis ==
Lewis Eliot, now sixty, experiences a medical condition that requires surgery. After a near fatal cardiac arrest, Eliot confronts his past life as well as reconciliation with his son Charles.

== Reception ==
In a 1970 book review in Kirkus Reviews, it was said that "Mr. Snow is so eminently sane and reasonable that he cannot but persuade the reader even where he fails to engage him on more personal terms..." Critic Stanley Weintraub of the New York Times called the novel's publication "a genuine literary event". After summarizing the previous novels in the cycle, Weintraub writes; "The long and memorable cycle has ended, and through it as in no other work in our time we have explored the inner life of the new classless class that is the 20th century Establishment." In a review in The New York Review of Books, Michael Wood wrote "It is characteristic of Snow’s lack of moral or literary tact that he can suggest an eschatological climax when he is merely finishing off a thick slice of middle-class English life."

== Adaptation ==
The novel was adapted for television in the series Strangers and Brothers, which started Shaughan Seymour as Lewis Eliot, Cherie Lunghi as Margaret Eliot and Robert Burbage as Charles Eliot
