= The Sleep of Reason (Snow novel) =

Novel by C. P. Snow

- First edition
- Author: C. P. Snow
- Language: English
- Series: Strangers and Brothers
- Publisher: Macmillan
- Publication date: 1968
- Publication place: United Kingdom
- Media type: Print
- Preceded by: Corridors of Power
- Followed by: Last Things

The Sleep of Reason is the tenth book in C. P. Snow's Strangers and Brothers series.

== Plot synopsis ==
Lewis Eliot returns to his home town during the trial of two young women for murder. Eliot and his generation strive to understand the society of the 1960s.

== Reception ==
In a 1968 book review in Kirkus Reviews summarised the book as: "Snow's approach is as massively ceremonious as ever. Each character is introduced by an organ chord of commentary: thoughts are as long as life; characters from other books are prodded into being. But there is a certain dogged majesty in this far exit as Snow lumbers down the halls of power."

== Adaptation ==
The novel was adapted for television in the series Strangers and Brothers, which started Shaughan Seymour as Lewis Eliot
