= The New Men =

1954 novel by C. P. Snow

- First edition
- Author: C. P. Snow
- Language: English
- Series: Strangers and Brothers
- Publisher: Macmillan Publishers
- Publication date: 1954
- Publication place: United Kingdom
- Media type: Print (Hardcover and Paperback)
- Preceded by: The Masters
- Followed by: Homecomings

The New Men, published in 1954, is the sixth novel in C. P. Snow's series Strangers and Brothers.

== Plot synopsis ==
Lewis Eliot, his brother Martin, and Cambridge fellow, Walter Luke become involved with the scientific community and reaction to the development and deployment of nuclear weapons by Britain during the Second World War.

The story's main location is a fictional early British nuclear experimental establishment where the characters try to get an early nuclear pile going and also try to harvest enough enriched uranium or plutonium (they settle on going for plutonium) to try to beat the Americans to the bomb.

As Snow's science researchers, and science civil servant, characters are, or were, portrayed as Cambridge dons in this book (and the previous book in the series - The Masters) he clearly did want to make the location of the research station the real UK nuclear Centre at Harwell (which was once known as the Atomic Energy Research Establishment ) with its close association with Oxford. So instead, as this line from the book puts it,: “For a site, they picked on a place called Barford –which I had not heard of, but found to be a village in Warwickshire, a few miles from Stratford-upon-Avon”.

Several commentators on the book claim, or suggest, that not only is the research station fictional but so is the village of Barford. In fact Barford is a real village in Warwickshire, and it is indeed not far from Stratford-upon-Avon. However, if the “final” version of the research station as described in the last chapter of the book was real it would certainly have more than dominated the actual real village of Barford.

== Reception ==
The 1954 book review in Kirkus Reviews summarized; "For the thoughtful reader, the complex here of ideas and ideals, the duality of progress- towards destruction, forms an abstraction which is handled with intelligence." In 1954 the novel was awarded (jointly with The Masters, the previous novel in the Strangers and Brothers sequence) the James Tait Black Prize for Fiction.

== Adaptation for Radio ==
The novel was adapted for television in Strangers and Brothers, which started Shaughan Seymour as Lewis Eliot, and Stephen Riddle as Martin Eliot. The novel was also adapted as a play for BBC Radio 4 as episode 6 of a series of adaptations of all CP Snow's Strangers and Brothers series. It was dramatised by Jonathan Holloway, with David Haig as Lewis Eliot, and Tim McInnerny playing Martin Eliot. It was first broadcast on 4 June 2003.
