= Time of Hope =

Novel by C. P. Snow

- First edition
- Author: C. P. Snow
- Language: English
- Series: Strangers and Brothers
- Genre: Political
- Publisher: Faber & Faber
- Publication date: 1949
- Publication place: United Kingdom
- Media type: Print (Hardcover and Paperback)
- Pages: 320pp
- Followed by: George Passant (reading order)

Time of Hope is the first chronological entry in C. P. Snow's series of novels Strangers and Brothers, and the third to be published. It depicts the beginning of Lewis Eliot's life, with a childhood in poverty in a small English town at the beginning of the 20th century.

== Plot synopsis ==
Lewis Eliot is walking home in the summer of 1914 when he is struck by an intuition of disaster, and he runs back home to find his mother having her fortune told with cards. At first he is reassured by the peaceful scene, but his Aunt Milly is scornful when she sees this, and he soon learns that his father has gone bankrupt. Over the next few years, the family's lifestyle is constrained, and his mother dies of heart failure in her late forties. Eliot has promised his mother to make something of himself. He works hard, befriends lawyers (including George Passant, whose story is told in the second book) and plans to become a solicitor. However, one of his aunts leaves him a sum of money which is just enough to allow him to study to become a barrister. This is a dangerous thing to attempt, but he succeeds in his examinations, and moves to London.

With great labour, he staves off illness and begins his practice, but his life is disrupted by his courting of Sheila Knight, an unstable woman who does not love him. He recognises that they are not suited for each other, but he is determined to marry her, and he frightens away another man, whom she is fond of, by telling him about her difficult personality. Eventually Lewis and Sheila marry. Sheila's unhappiness and unpredictability damage his social life, and he comes to the conclusion that he is unlikely to succeed either in his marriage or in his profession.

== Reception ==
In a 1950 book review in Kirkus Reviews the book was called "A book of introspective portraiture rather than a novel of action—this is the almost slow-motion story of the development of Lewis Eliot... A portrait of the times—highlighted rather than rounded canvas—this story leaves an odd impression of detachment, emotionally-an almost coldly analytical dissection. Better written than the average modern novel—it yet fails to capture the heart of the reader. The link with its predecessor, The Light and the Dark is in the person of Lewis Eliot, narrator in that novel of a period just beyond that encompassed in Time of Hope. Not for a wide market."

== Adaptation ==
The novel was adapted in the 1984 television series Strangers and Brothers, which started Shaughan Seymour as Lewis Eliot.
