= Edwin Nixon =

British business leader (1925–2008)

Sir Edwin Ronald Nixon CBE (21 June 1925 – 17 August 2008) was an eminent British business leader who headed IBM's operations in the country for over 20 years.

Born in 1925, he was educated at Alderman Newton's School, Leicester, and Selwyn College, Cambridge. After a spell at Dexion, he joined IBM UK in 1955 and was successively managing director, chairman, and chief executive before becoming chairman of Amersham International in 1988. A former deputy lieutenant of Hampshire, he died in 2008.
