= Judith V. Field =

British historian of mathematics and art

- Born: Judith Veronica Field; 1943 (age 82–83)

Academic background
- Education: Imperial College, London
- Thesis: Kepler's Geometrical Cosmology (1981)
- Doctoral advisor: A. Rupert Hall

Academic work
- Discipline: History
- Sub-discipline: History of mathematics

Judith Veronica Field (born 1943) is a British historian of science with interests in mathematics and the impact of science in art, an honorary visiting research fellow in the Department of History of Art of Birkbeck, University of London, former president of the British Society for the History of Mathematics, and president of the Leonardo da Vinci Society.

== Education and career ==
Field earned a PhD in 1981 at Imperial College of the University of London; her dissertation, Kepler's Geometrical Cosmology, was supervised by A. Rupert Hall, and later became one of her books.

She was president of the British Society for the History of Mathematics for 1997–1999. She became a corresponding member of the International Academy of the History of Science in 1988, and a full member in 1998.

== Books ==
Field is the author of books including:

- The Geometrical Work of Girard Desargues (with J. J. Gray, Springer, 1987)
- Kepler's Geometrical Cosmology (Athlone Press, 1988; Bloomsbury, 2013)
- The Invention of Infinity: Mathematics and Art in the Renaissance (Oxford University Press and Princeton University Press, 1997)
- Science in Art: Works in the National Gallery That Illustrate the History of Science and Technology (with Frank A. J. L. James, British Society for the History of Science, 1997)
- Piero Della Francesca: A Mathematician's Art (Yale University Press, 2005)
- Byzantine and Arabic Mathematical Gearing (with D. R. Hill and M. T. Wright, Science Museum London, 1985)

She is the co-editor of:

- Renaissance and Revolution: Humanists, Scholars, Craftsmen and Natural Philosophers in Early Modern Europe (with Frank A. J. L. James, Cambridge University Press, 1993)
- Breaking Teleprinter Ciphers at Bletchley Park: An edition of I.J. Good, D. Michie and G. Timms: General Report on Tunny with Emphasis on Statistical Methods (I. J. Good, D. Michie, and G. Timms (1945), edited by J. Reeds, W. Diffie, and J.V. Field, IEEE and Wiley, 2015)

She is also a translator of:

- Mathematics and Mathematicians (P. Dedron and J. Itard, two vols., Transworld, 1974 and Open University Press, 1978).
- The Harmony of the World (Johannes Kepler, translated into English with an introduction and notes, by E. J. Aiton, A. M. Duncan and J. V. Field; Memoirs of the American Philosophical Society, vol. 209, Philadelphia, 1997)
- Ibn al-Haytham's Theory of Conics, Geometrical Constructions and Practical Geometry (A history of Arabic Science and mathematics, vol. 3, Roshdi Rashed, Routledge, 2013)
- Ibn al-Haytham, New Spherical Geometry and Astronomy (A history of Arabic science and mathematics, vol. 4, Roshdi Rashed, Routledge, 2014)
- Ibn al-Haytham's Geometrical Methods and the Philosophy of Mathematics (A history of Arabic science and mathematics, vol. 5, Roshdi Rashed, Routledge, 2017)
