= Alderman Newton's School =

School in Leicester, England

Coordinates: 52.634°N 1.138°W

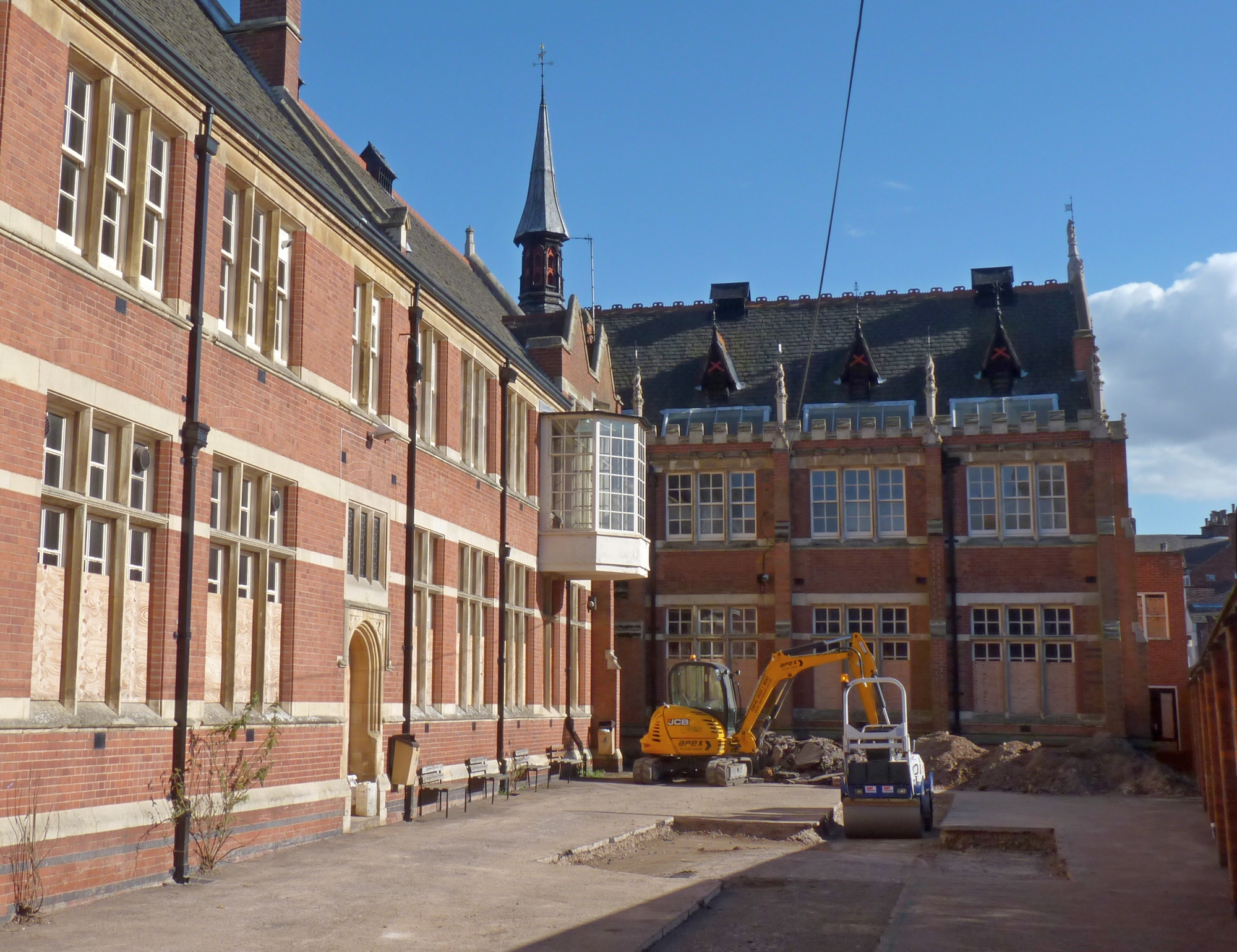
Site of Alderman Newton's Boys School, Greyfriars, Leicester, from 1864 to 1920. The Alderman Newton's Girls School was set up at the "Wyggestone School" building in another part of Leicester. The boys school continued at the Greyfriars premises until 1999.

Alderman Newton's Boys School was a school in Leicester, England. It was a grammar school then became a comprehensive school.

The original school was opened in 1784, thanks to money bequeathed by a former Mayor of Leicester, Gabriel Newton. Land at Greyfriars, Leicester acquired by the school in 1863 later proved to be the site of the Greyfriars friary church which contained the site of the grave of King Richard III. The school building has been converted to house the King Richard III Visitor Centre.

Its pupils were known as Newtonians. They wore a uniform of green coats, which later became a Green Blazer with red piping around the cuffs and coat tails. The lower school, on the opposite side to the Cathedral and Greyfriars was where the 1st and 2nd year juniors were located. In the post war years well into the 1970s the lower school boys had to wear the green school blazer and the green cap with red cords. All boys had to wear the cap for fear of detention whilst walking between the lower and main school or the dinner block opposite the lower school. They also had to doff their caps to any "Masters" (teachers) whom they met along the street. The Masters mostly wore their black graduate gowns. On special occasions, such as the annual prize-giving held at the De Montfort Hall, the Masters would also wear their University stoles or colours which denoted their university of graduation. Some of these entailed quite elaborate faux fur collars.

The school was closed in 1999 when it was merged by the local authority with two other local schools to form a single school. The road where the new school is located is named Greencoat Road in acknowledgement of the green coats worn by Alderman Newton's School pupils.

There is an Old Newtonians Society for ex-pupils and an Old Newtonians Rugby Football club.

Notable teachers at the school included Harry Hoff as physics master (who later wrote novels under the name William Cooper) and H. E. Howard, history master.

== Notable former pupils ==
- Peter Bowler (born 1944), historian of science
- Wallas Eaton (1917–1995), actor
- A. Rupert Hall (1920–2009), historian of science
- Sir Greg Knight (born 1949), conservative politician
- Neil McKendrick (born 1935), historian
- Harry Morley (1881–1943), artist and illustrator
- Sir Edwin Nixon (1925–2008), IBM executive
- Theodore Plucknett (1897–1965), academic and historian
- Sir John Plumb (1911–2001), historian
- Charles Percy Snow, Baron Snow (1905–1980), academic and novelist
- Philip Snow (1915–2012), cricketer and colonial administrator
- Trevor Storer (1930–2013), baker, founder of Pukka Pies
- Eric Trapp (1910–1993), Anglican Bishop of Zululand and later of Bermuda
- Sir Alan Walters (1926–2009), economist and advisor to Margaret Thatcher
- Henry Widdowson (born 1935), linguist, Emeritus Professor of Education, University of London
- Bernard Green (1931–1998) Member of the Royal Society of Chemistry
