= The Affair (Wednesday Theatre) =

- Wednesday Theatre episode
- Episode no.: Season 1 Episode 33
- Directed by: Eric Taylor
- Teleplay by: Ronald Miller
- Based on: The Affairl by C. P. Snow
- Original air dates: 18 August 1965 (Melbourne, Sydney)
- Running time: 90 mins

Episode chronology
← Previous "Ever Since Paradise"	Next → "Winter in Ischia"

"The Affair" is a 1965 Australian television play based on the novel by C. P. Snow. It starred Roger Climpson, Richard Meikle and Anne Haddy and aired on the ABC as part of Wednesday Theatre.

Australian TV drama was relatively rare at the time.

== Plot ==
A young Cambridge scientist, Donald Howard, introvertive and unpopular, is accused of fraud and dismissed from his fellowship. The twenty fellows attempt to dismiss their feelings of unease by calling him guilty. His wife campaigns for him, splitting the college into two factions, one which sticks by the original verdict the other which seeks to re-try him.

== Cast ==
- Richard Meikle as Donald Howard
- Brian James as Sir Lewis Eliot
- Anne Haddy as Laura Howard
- Alexander Archdale
- Raymond Westwell as Gibert Dawson-Hill
- Roger Climpson
- John Brunskill as the master
- Ron Haddrick as Skefflington
- Richard Parry
- Atholl Fleming
- Frank Taylor
- Charles Tasman
- Wendy Playfair
- Lou Vernon

== Production ==
The script was based on the Dreyfus Case. The production was filmed at the ABC's studios in Gore Hill, Sydney. It was the third in a trilogy of stories set at Cambridge.

== Reception ==
The Woman's Weekly called it "a milestone in local drama. It was good, world-class TV, not a production that can be tarnished by the tag "good for an Australian one." It was a wonderful play... The cast did well, and the producer did wonders."

The Sydney Morning Herald thought it was "outstandingly cast and intelligently produced" but thought the story had flaws.
