= Marie Boas Hall =

American historian of science (1919 – 2009)

- Born: Marie Boas; October 18, 1919; Springfield, Massachusetts, U.S.
- Died: February 23, 2009 (aged 89)
- Education: Radcliffe College, AB, chemistry, 1940; Cornell University, PhD, 1949
- Occupation: Historian of science
- Employer(s): Massachusetts Institute of Technology, Brandeis University, University of California, Los Angeles, Indiana University, Imperial College London
- Spouse: Alfred Rupert Hall
- Relatives: Older brother, mathematician Ralph P. Boas Jr.
- Awards: George Sarton Medal, Fellow of the British Academy, American Academy of Arts and Sciences

Marie Boas Hall FBA (October 18, 1919 – February 23, 2009) was an American historian of science and is considered one of the postwar period pioneers of the study of the Scientific Revolution during the 16th and 17th centuries.

== Early life and education ==
Boas was born Marie Boas in Springfield, Massachusetts, on October 18, 1919. Her parents, Ralph Boas and Louise Schulz, were English teachers at Wheaton college in Norton. Her older brother was mathematician Ralph P. Boas Jr. and her uncle was historian of ideas George Boas.

She graduated from Radcliffe College in 1940. During World War II, she worked in the MIT Radiation Laboratory with Henry Guerlac in writing the history of the laboratory and of the operational use of radar during the war. She continued her work with Guerlac at Cornell University and received her PhD in 1949. Her thesis covered the mechanical philosophy of Robert Boyle and was published in the history of science journal Osiris in 1952.

== Career ==
After receiving her doctorate from Cornell University, she took a teaching position at the University of Massachusetts and subsequently moved to Brandeis University.

Marie Boas went to England from the US, "to work on Robert Boyle's papers, and met Hall, who was working on Isaac Newton's. In 1957 she returned to the University of California, Los Angeles; and in 1959 Hall, whose first marriage had ended in divorce, joined her there and they were married. Two years later they went to Indiana University. In 1963 they were invited back to London, to Imperial College, where Hall became the first professor of the history of science and she senior lecturer. There they trained many graduate students."

She was elected a Fellow of the American Academy of Arts and Sciences in 1955. She won the George Sarton Medal, the most prestigious award of the History of Science Society, together with her husband Alfred Rupert Hall in 1981.

== Works ==
- Robert Boyle and Seventeenth-Century Chemistry. Cambridge: Cambridge University Press, 1958.
- The Scientific Renaissance, 1450-1630. New York: Harper, 1962. ISBN 0-486-28115-9
- Robert Boyle on Natural Philosophy: An Essay, with Selections from His Writings. Bloomington: Indiana University Press, 1965.
- Nature and Nature's Laws. Documents of the Scientific Revolution. London: Macmillan, 1970.
- The Mechanical Philosophy. New York: Arno Press, 1981.
- All Scientists Now: The Royal Society in the Nineteenth Century. Cambridge: Cambridge University Press, 1984. ISBN 0-521-89263-5
- Promoting Experimental Learning: Experiment and the Royal Society, 1660-1727. Cambridge: Cambridge University Press, 1991. ISBN 0-521-89265-1
- Henry Oldenburg: Shaping the Royal Society. Oxford: Oxford University Press, 2002. ISBN 0-19-851053-5

== See also ==
- History of science in the Renaissance
