= A. Rupert Hall =

British historian of science (1920–2009)

A. Rupert Hall FBA
- Born: Alfred Rupert Hall; 26 July 1920; Near Stoke-on-Trent, England
- Died: 5 February 2009 (aged 88)
- Spouses: Annie Hughes (m. 1941; div. 1959); Marie Boas Hall (m. 1959)

Academic background
- Education: Christ's College, Cambridge
- Thesis: Ballistics in the Seventeenth Century (c. 1950)
- Academic advisor: Anthony Steel
- Influences: Herbert Butterfield; Alexandre Koyré

Academic work
- Discipline: History
- Sub-discipline: History of science
- Institutions: Christ's College, Cambridge; Imperial College, London
- Doctoral students: Judith V. Field

Alfred Rupert Hall FBA (26 July 1920 – 5 February 2009) was a prominent British historian of science, known as editor of a collection of Isaac Newton's unpublished scientific papers (1962), and Newton's correspondence, in 1977.

== Life ==
Hall was born near Stoke-on-Trent on 26 July 1920. He attended Alderman Newton's School, Leicester, where he came under the influence of history teacher H. E. Howard, and then went to Christ's College, Cambridge, in 1938 to study history, but his studies were interrupted by war service. He completed his degree in 1946 and began postgraduate research. As a boy he had delighted in the history of inventions and devices, and the army had given him hands-on experience; his doctoral thesis which was on 17th-century ballistics was published as a book in 1952. In 1949 he was elected a fellow of Christ's College.

Hall was unusual in coming to the discipline from history, not science, and his background would yield fresh and different perspectives in this new emerging field. Charles Singer, the first president of the British Society for the History of Science, was not alone in having suspicions about someone without a scientific education teaching the history of science. Hall won him round, and they were to co-operate in editing the five-volume History of Technology published by Oxford University Press in 1954–1958.

In 1948 Hall was appointed as the first curator of the Whipple Museum of the History of Science, in Cambridge, and in 1950 began lecturing in the subject. Soon, the discipline was formally accepted into the tripos structure of degrees, and the department of history and philosophy of science was established, now the largest university department of its kind in the UK.

Meanwhile, Marie Boas had come from the US to work on Robert Boyle's papers, and met Hall, who was working on Isaac Newton's. In 1959 Hall, whose first marriage had ended in divorce, joined her in the US and they were married. In 1963 they were invited back to Imperial College in London, where Hall became the first professor of the history of science. From 1966 to 1968 he was the president of the British Society for the History of Science. His 1973 Wilkins Lecture is entitled Newton and his editors.

Between 1962 and 1986 the Halls edited, translated and published in 13 volumes the correspondence of Henry Oldenburg, the secretary of the Royal Society in its early days, and founding editor of its journal, Philosophical Transactions, which grew out of his extensive international letter-writing. They also edited a valuable collection of Newton's unpublished scientific papers (1962). In 1980 he published Philosophers at War, an account of Newton's disreputable quarrel with Leibniz.

Rupert directed the Wellcome Trust programme on the history of medicine for four years, a programme which funds courses in various universities and gives bursaries to individuals.

Hall died on 5 February 2009.

As David Knight ends the obituary to Rupert Hall published in The Guardian in 2009: "Rupert and Marie were inseparable and devoted; she died 18 days after him. They not only filled gaps in our knowledge of 17th-century science, but were exemplary in being genial, encouraging and helpful to younger scholars."

== Works ==
- Ballistics in the seventeenth century; a study in the relations of science and war with reference principally to England. Cambridge [Eng.]: Cambridge University Press, 1952.
- The scientific revolution, 1500-1800; the formation of the modern scientific attitude. London: Longmans, Green, 1954.
- Isaac Newton. Unpublished scientific papers of Isaac Newton: a selection from the Portsmouth collection in the University Library, Cambridge. (Edited by A. Hall and Marie Boas Hall.) Cambridge [Eng.]: Cambridge University Press, 1962.
- Correspondence of Henry Oldenburg. (Edited by A. Rupert Hall and Marie Boas Hall.) Madison: University of Wisconsin Press, 1965, Volume I. (Of the 13 volumes, Volume VIII contains the 1st appearance of correspondence with Isaac Newton.)
- The Cambridge Philosophical Society: a history, 1819-1969. Cambridge [Eng.]: Scientific Periodical Library, 1969. ISBN 0950034819
- Philosophers at war: the quarrel between Newton and Leibniz. Cambridge [Eng.]: Cambridge University Press, 1980. Hall, Alfred Rupert (12 September 2002). 2002 pbk edition. Cambridge University Press. ISBN 052152489X.
- From Galileo to Newton. New York: Dover Publications, 1981. 1st edition published in 1963 by Harper & Row; 2012 reprint
- The revolution in science, 1500-1750. 3rd ed. London: Longman, 1983. 1988 pbk edition of 3rd edition. ISBN 0813800544.
- Henry More: magic, religion, and experiment. Blackwell science biographies. Oxford [Eng.]: Blackwell, 1990. ISBN 978-0-631-17295-6 1996 pbk edition. Cambridge University Press. 11 April 1996. ISBN 9780521562232.
- Isaac Newton, adventurer in thought. Blackwell science biographies. Oxford [Eng.]: Blackwell, 1992. ISBN 9780521566698
- History of technology. London: Mansell. (with Norman Alfred Fisher Smith)

Non-profit organization positions
Preceded by Edwin Clarke as Director of the Wellcome; Institute for the History of Medicine	Chairman of the Wellcome Institute for the History of Medicine; 1980–1981	Succeeded by Peter Williams as Director of the Wellcome; Institute for the History of Medicine
Professional and academic associations
Preceded by R. V. Jones	Wilkins Lecturer; 1973	Succeeded by Margaret Gowing
Preceded by David Hopwood	Leeuwenhoek Lecturer; 1988	Succeeded by Piet Borst
Awards
Preceded by Marshall Clagett	George Sarton Medal; 1981; With: Marie Boas Hall	Succeeded by Thomas Kuhn
