= The Conscience of the Rich =

Novel by C.P. Snow

- First edition
- Author: C. P. Snow
- Cover artist: Sidney Nolan
- Language: English
- Series: Strangers and Brothers
- Genre: Political fiction
- Publisher: Macmillan Publishers
- Publication date: 1958
- Publication place: United Kingdom
- Media type: Print (Hardcover and Paperback)
- ISBN: 0684105624
- Preceded by: George Passant (reading order)
- Followed by: The Light and the Dark (reading order)

The Conscience of the Rich is the seventh published of C. P. Snow's series of novels Strangers and Brothers, but the third according to the internal chronology. It details the lives of Charles, Katherine and their father, Leonard March, a wealthy Jewish family. Lewis Eliot narrates the story of the conflicting politics of wealth and pre-World War II socialism in England.

According to Charles Brasch, the family was based on the family of Mary Lucas, who had married out to Donald Lucas from her own wealthy, narrow and orthodox Jewish family. Brasch recognised a few touches which might have been drawn from his own Hallenstein and Michaelis family.

== Reception ==
The contemporary book review in Kirkus Reviews summarized the book: "The market for the earlier books should clearly determine the demand for this new novel; it is leisurely, intelligent and incisive."
