= Ramse Mostoller =

Costume designer

Ramse Mostoller was a costume designer known for her works on Dark Shadows and these other soap operas: Ryan's Hope, The Doctors and Another World. As well as children's shows Sesame Street and the Electric Company . She also did costume designs for the film House of Dark Shadows in 1970. From 1968 onwards, she was credited as simply Mostoller.

== Filmography as costumer ==
- Ryan's Hope (760 episodes, 1975–1980)
- The Secret Storm (1970) (credited as Ramsey Mostoller)
- House of Dark Shadows (1970)
- Dark Shadows (1,093 episodes, 1966–1970)
- Sesame Street (1969)
- Dead of Night: A Darkness at Blaisedon (1969) (TV)
- Santa Claus Conquers the Martians (1964)
- Another World (1964)
- The Doctors (1963)

== Theatre ==
- Venus Is (1966)
- The Impossible Years (1967)
- The Affair (1962)
