= You Can't Win (TV series) =

- Genre: Drama
- Starring: Ian McShane
- Original language: English
- No. of series: 1
- No. of episodes: 7

Production
- Production company: Granada Television

Original release
- Network: ITV
- Release: 1966

You Can't Win is a 1966 British television series made by ITV as an adaptation of the novels Scenes from Provincial Life and Scenes from Married Life by William Cooper. It stars Ian McShane as protagonist Joe Lunn, an English provincial grammar school physics teacher in 1939 who later moves to London and into the English establishment.

The show was produced by Granada Television.

== Cast ==
- Ian McShane as Joe Lunn
- John Humphry as Robert Watson
- Peter Birrel as Tom Jacobs
- Anton Darby as Steve
- Patricia Garwood as Myrtle
- Andrew Rimmer as Trevor
- David Robinson as Frank
- Jennie Linden as Elspeth
- Michael Barrington as Roland Bolshaw
- Ann Curthoys as Annette
- Rosemary Frankau as Miss Froggatt
- Roger Hammond as Harry
- Donald Hewlett as Daddy
- Marie Hopps as Mrs Harrison
- Mike Lucas as Benny
- Geraldine Newman as Barbara
- William Victor as Fred
- Anna Sweeney as Jennifer
- Heather Spratt as Shirley
- Elizabeth Weaver as Sybil
- Janet Norman as Daphne
- Patricia Garwood as Myrtle
- Gillian Lewis as Virginia
- Ray Gatenby as Spinks

== Episode list ==
The show included seven episodes.

1. Who's for America?
2. In at the Deep End
3. Chaos is Come
4. Goodbye Myrtle Goodbye
5. The New Look
6. Learning the Law
7. The Stream of Life
