= The Light and the Dark =

1947 novel by C. P. Snow

The Light and the Dark: a novel
- First edition cover
- Author: C. P. Snow
- Language: English
- Series: Strangers and Brothers
- Publisher: London : Faber
- Publication date: 1947
- Publication place: United Kingdom
- Media type: Print
- Pages: 392
- Preceded by: The Conscience of the Rich
- Followed by: The Masters

The Light and the Dark is the fourth novel in C. P. Snow's Strangers and Brothers series. The book portrays narrator Lewis Eliot's friendship with Roy Calvert, and Calvert's inner turmoil and quest for meaning in life. Calvert was based on Snow's friend, Coptic scholar, Charles Allberry. Their relationship is developed further in The Masters.

== Plot synopsis ==
Set in England in the lead-up to and during World War II, it portrays Lewis Eliot's friendship with the gifted scholar and remarkable individual Roy Calvert, and Calvert's inner turmoil and quest for meaning in life.

== Title ==
The title—The Light and the Dark—refers to the beliefs of Manichaeism, which the book refers to as "Christian heresy" but is now often referred to as religion in its own right. "In its cosmology, the whole of cosmology is a battle of the light against the dark. Man's spirit is part of the light, and his flesh of the dark." The title also has resonance to the buildup to war, the sense of catastrophe so widespread in the 1930s, and Calvert's mental health problems.

== Reception ==
In 1947, a book review in Kirkus Reviews called the book "A rather long drawn out search of a brilliant scholar to escape his doom of despair and find a meaning in his life." and summarized; "Good writing and interesting characterizations fail to keep the book from tedious periods."
