= The Masters (novel) =

Book by C.P. Snow

- First edition
- Author: C. P. Snow
- Language: English
- Series: Strangers and Brothers
- Publisher: Macmillan Publishers
- Publication date: 1951
- Publication place: United Kingdom
- Media type: Print (Hardcover and Paperback)
- Pages: 320pp
- Preceded by: The Light and the Dark (reading order)
- Followed by: The New Men (reading order)

The Masters is the fifth novel in C. P. Snow's series Strangers and Brothers. It involves the election of a new Master at narrator Lewis Eliot's unnamed Cambridge College, which resembles Christ's College where Snow was a fellow. The 1951 novel's dedication is "In memory of G. H. Hardy", the Cambridge mathematician. It was the first of the Strangers and Brothers series to be published in the United States.

== Plot synopsis ==
The novel is set in 1937, with the growing threat from Nazi Germany as the backdrop. The two candidates for election as new Master are Crawford, who is politically radical and prepared to make sure the college makes a stand against appeasing Hitler, but whom Eliot believes will not be good at dealing with people; and Jago, whom Eliot believes would make a good master, but whose wife is seen by some as a liability. Much of the interest of the novel lies in its analysis of the motives and political manoeuvres of the people campaigning for their chosen candidates.

== Reception ==
A 1951 book review in Kirkus Reviews stated; "While not wholly enmeshed in the earlier books, familiarity with them would enhance appreciation of this, which taken alone seems at times slow moving, the emphasis on character and background rather than advancing the plot."

== Inspirations ==
The plot of The Masters may be inspired by Barchester Towers by Anthony Trollope, in which an English city's bishop dies and a successor is selected. C.P. Snow wrote a biography of Trollope.

== Dramatic versions ==
Ronald Millar's dramatisation of the novel opened at the Savoy Theatre, London, on 29 May 1963, and ran for eight months. John Clements, who directed it, played Jago, and David Dodimead Lewis Eliot. John Barron was Crawford.

The story was broadcast by BBC Radio in August 1958 in a dramatisation by E. J. King Bull. John Phillips played Eliot, Geoffrey Lumsden Jago and Frederick Treves Crawford.

In the long BBC Radio serialisation of the recently completed Strangers and Brothers sequence in 1971, Geoffrey Matthews as Eliot, Noel Johnson as Jago, and Alan Wheatley as Crawford.

An adaptation of Ronald Millar's stage version was broadcast on the BBC Overseas Service in 1974 with John Pullen as Eliot, Denys Hawthorne as Jago, and Frederick Treves again playing Crawford.

In the BBC's 1984 television serialisation of the sequence, Frederick Treves moved to the part of Vernon Royce, the dying Master. Shaughan Seymour played Eliot, John Carson as Jago, and Clifford Rose as Crawford.

In the BBC Radio 4 Classic Serial adaptation by Jonathan Howell of the Strangers and Brothers series, first broadcast in 2003, the parts in The Masters were played by David Haig as Narrator, Adam Godley as Lewis Eliot, Philip Franks as Arthur Brown, Matthew Marsh as Chrystal, David Calder as Jago, Hugh Quarshie as Crawford, Adam Levy as Roy Calvert, Andy Taylor as Francis Getliffe, Clive Merrison as Winslow, Joanna Monro as Alice Jago, Ian Hogg as Sir Horace Timberlake, Peter Howell as Despard-Smith, Anastasia Hille as Sheila Eliot, Patrick Godfrey as Robinson, and Carla Simpson as Betty Vane.
