= Philip Snow =

English-Fijian cricketer

Personal information
- Full name: Philip Albert Snow
- Born: 7 August 1915; Leicester, Leicestershire, England
- Died: 4 June 2012 (aged 96); England, United Kingdom

International information
- National side: Fiji

Career statistics
Competition	First-class
Matches	5
Runs scored	121
Batting average	17.28
100s/50s	–/–
Top score	38
Balls bowled	143
Wickets	4
Bowling average	25.25
5 wickets in innings	–
10 wickets in match	–
Best bowling	2/60
Catches/stumpings	1/–
- Source: Cricinfo, 13 March 2010

Philip Albert Snow OBE (7 August 1915 – 4 June 2012) was an English cricketer.

In 1936 Snow made his debut for the Leicestershire Second XI against the Nottinghamshire Second XI. From 1936 to 1937 Snow played four matches for the Leicestershire Second XI.

Snow made his first-class debut for Fiji in 1948 against Auckland during Fiji's tour of New Zealand. Snow made 5 first-class appearances on tour, with his final first-class match for Fiji coming against Auckland.

In his 5 first-class matches for Fiji he scored 121 runs at a batting average of 17.28, with a high score of 38. With the ball he took 4 wickets at a bowling average of 25.25, with best figures of 2/60.

Philip Snow was the younger brother of the scientist and author C. P. Snow – of whom he wrote the biography Stranger and brother: a portrait of C. P. Snow (1982) – and the historian Eric Snow. He was educated at Alderman Newton's School, Leicester and Christ's College, Cambridge, and was by profession a colonial administrator in Fiji.
