= William Cooper (novelist) =

English novelist (1910–2002)

- Born: Harry Summerfield Hoff; 4 August 1910; Crewe, England
- Died: 5 September 2002 (aged 92)
- Education: Christ's College, Cambridge
- Occupation: Novelist
- Writing career
- Notable work: Scenes from Provincial Life (1950)

Harry Summerfield Hoff FRSL (4 August 1910 – 5 September 2002) was an English novelist, writing under the name William Cooper.

== Life ==
H. S. Hoff (William Cooper) was born in Crewe, the son of elementary school teachers, and attended Crewe County Secondary School before reading natural sciences at Christ's College, Cambridge. After graduating in 1933 he was a teacher at Alderman Newton's School in Leicester, an experience on which he seems to have drawn for his novel Scenes from Provincial Life. Hoff served in the Signals Branch of the Royal Air Force in World War II, and later became a civil servant, associating closely with C. P. Snow, who appears in light disguise as Robert in Scenes from Provincial Life and its sequels. Amongst his appointments he worked for the UK Atomic Energy Authority and the Crown Agents. After retiring he held an academic position with Syracuse University, New York, lecturing on English literature to its students in London.

Hoff wrote four novels between 1934 and 1946 under his own name but made his reputation with his first novel under the pen name William Cooper (used from then on), Scenes from Provincial Life (1950), the first of five more or less autobiographical novels published over the ensuing half-century. It was hailed at once by writers such as Kingsley Amis, Anthony Burgess and John Braine, who wrote: "This book was for me – and I suspect many others –- a seminal influence" Deceptively simple in style and both comic and lyrical in tone, the novel tells of events in the lives of its narrator, Joe Lunn, a grammar school physics teacher; his girlfriend Myrtle, who wants him to marry her; his friend Tom, with whom he plans to emigrate to the USA; and various other characters in an English provincial town in the spring and summer of 1939. The novel's naturalism was a conscious rejection of the earlier modernist tradition of the English novel, which Hoff called the "Art Novel". Malcolm Bradbury wrote of it that "a good part of the literary styles and temper of the 1950s was set by this book."

There followed, in order of writing, Scenes from Metropolitan Life, Scenes from Married Life (1961), Scenes from Later Life (1983) and Scenes from Death and Life (1999). Scenes from Metropolitan Life, although written in the mid-1950s, remained unpublished until 1982, for legal reasons: the real-life prototype for the character of Myrtle, central to the novel, had threatened to sue if it were published. Scenes from Death and Life, Hoff's last published work, was turned down by Hoff's publisher Macmillan and was issued by a small independent company.

Hoff wrote 17 novels in all, as well as short stories, two plays and a biography of his friend C. P. Snow. In 1971, Hoff published an account of the trial of the two Hosein brothers, found guilty in 1970 of the kidnapping and murder of Muriel McKay, whom they had abducted in the belief that she was the wife of Rupert Murdoch. Hoff's fictional works were invariably optimistic and often outright comic, but with an understated sympathy for those dealing with the problems of ordinary life. He had a straightforward and uncensorious attitude to the sex lives of his characters and a respect for the young, which gave even his later novels a freshness and a contemporary resonance.

In 1951, Hoff married Joyce Harris, the model for the central character of Scenes from Married Life, who died in 1988. They had two daughters.

== Works ==
Novels

- Trina (as H. S. Hoff). London: Heinemann, 1934; as It Happened in PRK, New York, Coward McCann, 1934.
- Rhéa (as H. S. Hoff). London: Heinemann, 1935.
- Lisa (as H. S. Hoff). London: Heinemann, 1937.
- Three Marriages (as H. S. Hoff). London: Heinemann, 1946.
- Scenes from Provincial Life. London: Cape, 1950.
- The Struggles of Albert Woods. London: Cape, 1952; New York: Doubleday, 1953.
- The Ever-Interesting Topic. London: Cape, 1953.
- Disquiet and Peace. London: Macmillan, 1956; Philadelphia: Lippincott, 1957.
- Young People. London: Macmillan, 1958.
- Scenes from Married Life. London: Macmillan, 1961.
- Scenes from Life (includes Scenes from Provincial Life and Scenes from Married Life). New York: Scribner, 1961.
- Memoirs of a New Man. London: Macmillan, 1966.
- You Want the Right Frame of Reference. London, Macmillan, 1971.
- Love on the Coast. London: Macmillan, 1973.
- You're Not Alone: A Doctor's Diary. London: Macmillan, 1976.
- Scenes from Metropolitan Life. London: Macmillan, 1982.
- Scenes from Later Life. London: Macmillan, 1983.
- Scenes from Provincial Life, and Scenes from Metropolitan Life. New York: Dutton, 1983.
- Scenes from Married Life, and Scenes from Later Life. New York: Dutton, 1984.
- Immortality at Any Price. London: Sinclair Stevenson, 1991.
- Scenes from Death and Life (1999)

Uncollected short stories

- Ball of Paper, in Winter's Tales 1. London: Macmillan; New York: St. Martin's Press, 1955.
- A Moral Choice, in Winter's Tales 4. London: Macmillan; New York: St. Martin's Press, 1958.

Plays

- High Life (produced London, 1951).
- Prince Genji (1950; produced Oxford, 1968). London: Evans, 1959.

Non-fiction

- C.P. Snow. London: Longman, 1959; revised edition, 1971.
- Shall We Ever Know? The Trial of the Hosein Brothers for the Murder of Mrs. McKay. London: Hutchinson, 1971; as Brothers, New York: Harper, 1972.

Memoirs

- From Early Life. London: Macmillan, 1990.

== Adaptations ==
In 1966, Scenes from Provincial Life and Scenes from Married Life were adapted for a seven-part ITV series, You Can't Win, starring Ian McShane. BBC Radio 4 broadcast a version of Scenes from Provincial Life in the 1970s, and in 2003 broadcast a four-part dramatisation by Eric Pringle, with David Thorpe as Joe and Alison Pettitt as Myrtle. Malcolm Bradbury wrote a script for a TV dramatisation of Scenes from Provincial Life and Scenes from Metropolitan Life in six 55-minute episodes, which was never produced.

== Awards and honours ==
- 1996 Golden PEN Award
