= Strangers and Brothers =

1940–1970 novel series by C.P. Snow

- George Passant (first called Strangers and Brothers); The Light and the Dark; Time of Hope; The Masters; The New Men; Homecomings; The Conscience of the Rich; The Affair; Corridors of Power; The Sleep of Reason; Last Things
- Author: C. P. Snow
- Country: United Kingdom
- Language: English
- Publisher: Macmillan Publishers
- Media type: Print (Hardcover and Paperback)

Strangers and Brothers is a series of novels by C. P. Snow, published between 1940 and 1970. They deal with – among other things – questions of political and personal integrity, and the mechanics of exercising power.

== Plot ==
All eleven novels in the series are narrated by the character Lewis Eliot. The series follows his life and career from humble beginnings in an English provincial town, to reasonably successful London lawyer, to Cambridge don, to wartime service in Whitehall, to senior civil servant and finally retirement.

The New Men deals with the scientific community's involvement in (and reaction to) the development and deployment of nuclear weapons during the Second World War. The Conscience of the Rich concerns a wealthy, Anglo-Jewish merchant-banking family. Time of Hope and George Passant depict the price paid by clever, poor young men to escape their provincial origins.

Snow analyses the professional world, scrutinising microscopic shifts of power within the enclosed settings of a Cambridge college, a Whitehall ministry, a law firm. For example, in the novels set in the Cambridge college (a thinly veiled Christ's), a small, disparate group of men is typically required to reach a collective decision on an important subject. In The Masters, the dozen or so college members elect a new head (the Master) by majority vote. In The Affair, a small group of dons sets out to correct a possible injustice: they must convince the rest of the college to re-open an investigation into scientific fraud. In both novels, the characters strongly resist letting in the external world, whether it be the press, public opinion, the college Visitor, or outside experts.

== Narrative order ==
The narrative order of the books differs from their publication order.

| Order | Title | Story timeline | Published | In order of publication |
|---|---|---|---|---|
| 1 | Time of Hope | 1914–1933 | 1949 | 3 |
| 2 | George Passant (first called Strangers and Brothers) | 1925–1933 | 1940 | 1 |
| 3 | The Conscience of the Rich | 1927–1936 | 1958 | 7 |
| 4 | The Light and the Dark | 1935–1943 | 1947 | 2 |
| 5 | The Masters | 1937 | 1951 | 4 |
| 6 | The New Men | 1939–1946 | 1954 | 5 |
| 7 | Homecomings | 1938–1950 | 1956 | 6 |
| 8 | The Affair | 1953–1954 | 1960 | 8 |
| 9 | Corridors of Power | 1955–1958 | 1964 | 9 |
| 10 | The Sleep of Reason | 1963–1964 | 1968 | 10 |
| 11 | Last Things | 1964–1968 | 1970 | 11 |

== Adaptations ==
The books were adapted by the BBC into a 13-episode television series, which began airing in January 1984. The series starred Shaughan Seymour as Lewis, Sheila Ruskin as his mentally troubled first wife Sheila and Cherie Lunghi as his second wife Margaret. Other actors who were cast for the series include Anthony Hopkins, Nigel Havers, Peter Sallis and Tom Wilkinson. The series has been released on DVD in the Region 1 and 2 formats.

The BBC later adapted the books as a 10-episode Radio 4 Classic Serial, first broadcast in 2003, which starred Adam Godley (ep.1-5) then David Haig (ep.6-10) as Lewis, Anastasia Hille as Sheila and Juliet Aubrey as Margaret.
