= Corridors of Power (novel) =

1964 novel by C.P. Snow

- First edition (publ. Macmillan); Cover art by Sidney Nolan
- Author: C. P. Snow
- Language: English
- Series: Strangers and Brothers
- Publisher: Macmillan (UK); Scribners (US)
- Publication date: 1964
- Publication place: United Kingdom
- Media type: Print
- Preceded by: The Affair
- Followed by: The Sleep of Reason

Corridors of Power is the ninth book in C. P. Snow's Strangers and Brothers series. Its title had become a household phrase referring to the centres of government and power after Snow coined it in his earlier novel, Homecomings. (A slightly rueful Foreword to Corridors of Power expresses the hope that he is at least entitled to use his own cliché.)

== Plot synopsis ==
Corridors of Power is concerned with the attempts of an English MP to influence the country's policy on nuclear weapons in the 1950s. The central character is Roger Quaife, an ambitious politician and Cabinet Minister. He is widely attacked for his stand on Britain's position in the thermonuclear arms race; at the same time his extramarital affair leads to potential blackmail. Lewis Eliot attempts to assist him in covering up the affair as he supports Quaife's stand on the nuclear question.

== Reception ==
In a 1964 book review in Kirkus Reviews called the book "a sound reading of the political, moral, ideological temper of the times; a substantial achievement even though one in which intellect has been asserted at the expense of imagination." In a 1964 review in The New York Times, an anonymous reviewer praised Snow's previous work, but called the novel "the least successful in the series" and summarized; "Somehow the vitality, the narrative drive and the intellectual excitement of Sir Charles's other novels are lacking in this one."

== Dramatic versions ==
In the BBC's 1984 television serialisation of Strangers and Brothers, Shaughan Seymour played Lewis Eliot and Anthony Hopkins played Roger Quaife.
