= Strangers and Brothers (TV series) =

- Genre: Drama
- Based on: Strangers and Brothers by C. P. Snow
- Written by: Julian Bond
- Directed by: Jeremy Summers (7 episodes); Ronald Wilson (6 episodes)
- Composer: Kenyon Emrys-Roberts
- Country of origin: United Kingdom
- Original language: English
- No. of series: 1
- No. of episodes: 13

Production
- Producer: Philip Hinchcliffe
- Running time: 55 minutes
- Production company: BBC

Original release
- Network: BBC Two
- Release: 11 January – 4 April 1984

Strangers and Brothers is a 1984 British television series produced by the BBC. Adapted from the novel series of the same name by C. P. Snow, it ran for a single series of thirteen episodes between 11 January 1984 and 4 April 1984. The series was also aired as a seven part series in America on PBS-TV's Masterpiece Theatre between 1 May 1985 and 12 June 1985.

== Plot summary ==
The series focuses on the character Lewis Eliot, following his life and career from humble beginnings to being a successful London lawyer, Cambridge don, wartime civil servant, and finally to retirement. Eliot's private life is also explored, relating his unstable marriage to Sheila, his difficult affair with, and then marriage to, his second wife Margaret, and his relationships with his brother Martin and with the mercurial Roy Calvert.

The behind the scenes machinations in the election of a new Master at Eliot's college are explored in one episode.

The series also deals with the British scientific community's involvement in the development of nuclear weapons during World War II. The attempts by the ambitious politician Roger Quaife to halt Britain's nuclear programme results in scandal, and the loss of political influence by both Quaife and Eliot.

== Cast ==
- Shaughan Seymour as Lewis Eliot (13 episodes)
- Paul Hastings as Francis Getliffe (10 episodes)
- Edward Hardwicke as Sir Hector Rose (7 episodes)
- Sheila Ruskin as Sheila Eliot (6 episodes)
- Cherie Lunghi as Margaret Eliot (5 episodes)
- James Simmons as Walter Luke (5 episodes)
- Nigel Havers as Roy Calvert (4 episodes)
- Peter Sallis as Leonard March (3 episodes)
- Stephen Riddle as Martin Eliot (3 episodes)
- Martin Jacobs as Charles March (3 episodes)
- Elizabeth Spriggs as Lady Muriel Royce (3 episodes)
- Carmen Du Sautoy as Ann Simon (3 episodes)
- Kathryn Pogson as Joan Royce (3 episodes)
- Neil Stacy as Herbert Getliffe (3 episodes)
- James Cossins as Mr Knight (3 episodes)
- Emma Jacobs as Katherine March (3 episodes)
- Gawn Grainger as Dr Pearson (3 episodes)
- John Grillo as Arthur Brown (3 episodes)
- Anthony Hopkins as Roger Quaife (2 episodes)
- Susan Fleetwood as Lady Caroline Quaife (2 episodes)
- Christopher Casson as Austin Davidson (2 episodes)
- Tessa Peake-Jones as Irene Eliot (2 episodes)
- Frederick Treves as Vernon Royce (2 episodes)
- John Carson as Jago (2 episodes)
- Simon Oates as Major Darling (2 episodes)
- Tom Wilkinson as George Passant (2 episodes)
- Tony Britton as Lord Boscastle (2 episodes)
- Joan Greenwood as Lady Boscastle (2 episodes)
- John Normington as Monty Cave (2 episodes)
- Gareth Thomas as Arthur Mounteney (2 episodes)
- John Phillips as Reggie Collingwood (2 episodes)
- Alan MacNaughtan as Winslow (2 episodes)
- Michael Cochrane as Sammikins (2 episodes)
- Peter Copley as Despard-Smith (2 episodes)
- Tom Chadbon as Sir Douglas Osbaldiston (2 episodes)
- Michael Troughton as Jack Cotery (2 episodes)
- Gillian Bailey as Olive Calvert (2 episodes)
- Jeffry Wickham as Chrystal (2 episodes)
- Clifford Rose as Crawford (1 episode)
- Andrew Cruickshank as M.H.L. Gay (1 episode)
- Terence Alexander as R.S.Robinson (1 episode)
- Cyril Luckham as Eustace Pilbrow (1 episode)

== Casting ==
Shaughan Seymour later recalled:

"I accepted, of course", the series meant 11 months' work and just the lift I needed to establish myself on a more secure footing".

Peter Sallis later recalled:

"I enjoyed Strangers and Brothers enormously because it was so different, but if l'd have read it I don't think I'd have cast myself in it — or said that was the part I wanted to play or ought to play. "It was the director who said, 'That's what you're going to do, chum!'"

== Critical reception ==
In a 1985 review in The New York Times, John J. O'Connor praised only the episode based on the novel The Masters and called the series a "dud" and summarized; "the series as a whole—or at least its first half—fails to ignite with compelling characters and incidents. The themes are big, the issues are important, but Strangers and Brothers is a monumental disappointment."

Robert L. Jackson of the Los Angeles Times, called the series a "compelling insight" into the lives of bright young British professionals and a worthy successor to The Jewel in the Crown.

Kay Gardella of the New York Daily News, praised the series for its intelligent dialogue, its serious adult storytelling, its willingness to explore power, morality, and privilege and for the performances of Shaughan Seymour, Nigel Havers, Martyn Jacobs, Peter Sallis and Cherie Lunghi.

Carla Dobson of The Daily Telegraph, called the series an "excellent dramatisation of C. P. Snow's series of novels".

Arthur Unger of The Christian Science Monitor wrote: "Strangers and Brothers is a fascinatingly complex series overflowing with multileveled portraits of people who are strangers and brothers to themselves as well as to each other. If you choose to watch the series, they will undoubtedly become brothers, not strangers, to you, too".

Hugh Hebert of The Guardian gave the series a positive review and said that Julian Bond did a favour by serving it up fillted and trimmed for the table. He also called Peter Sallis performance as Leonard March one of the riches of the series.

Jon Anderson of the Chicago Tribune praised the series for its wit, wisdom, drama, its characters and for the relationships the characters have.

Judith Simons of the Daily Express called it a "series of much quality and style". The City Limits said: "Beware: it will be fatally addictive". The Times called it a "well acted production".

== Home media ==
The series was released on Region 1 DVD in the United States by Goldhil Home Media on 1 March 2001. The series was also released on Region 2 DVD in the United Kingdom by Simply Media on the 29 September 2014.

== Bibliography ==
- Ellen Baskin. Serials on British Television, 1950-1994. Scolar Press, 1996.
