= C. P. Snow =

English novelist and physical chemist (1905–1980)

The Right Honourable The Lord Snow CBE FRSL
- Snow c. 1955
- Born: Charles Percy Snow; 15 October 1905; Leicester, England
- Died: 1 July 1980 (aged 74); London, England
- Education: Alderman Newton's School; University College, Leicester; University of Cambridge (PhD)
- Known for: Strangers and Brothers; The Two Cultures; Corridors of Power
- Spouses: Pamela Hansford Johnson (m. 1950)
- Children: 1
- Scientific career
- Fields: Physics, chemistry, literature (novelist)
- Workplaces: University of Cambridge; English Electric; Civil Service
- Thesis: The Structure of Simple Molecules (1930)
- Doctoral students: Eric Eastwood

Lord Snow, of the city of Leicester, was born at 40 Richmond Road Leicester. This plaque is displayed opposite his birthplace.

Charles Percy Snow, Baron Snow (15 October 1905 – 1 July 1980) was an English novelist and physical chemist who also served in several important positions in the British Civil Service and briefly in the UK government. He is best known for his series of novels known collectively as Strangers and Brothers, and for "The Two Cultures", a 1959 lecture in which he laments the gulf between scientists and "literary intellectuals".

== Early life and education ==
Born in Leicester to William Snow, a church organist and choirmaster, and his wife Ada, Charles Snow was the second of four boys, his brothers being Harold, Eric and Philip Snow, and was educated at Alderman Newton's School.

In 1923, he passed the intermediate British School Certificate, but remained at Alderman Newton's to work as a laboratory assistant for a further two years. In 1925 he began a University of London external degree in science at University College, Leicester, graduating with a first in chemistry in 1927 and an MSc the following year. Upon leaving Leicester, Snow gained a prestigious Keddey-Fletcher-Warr postgraduate studentship worth £200, allowing him to embark on doctoral research at Christ's College, Cambridge. He received his PhD in physics from Cambridge in 1930, with a thesis on the infrared spectra of simple diatomic molecules.

== Career and research ==
In 1930 he became a Fellow of Christ's College. After a Nature paper on a new method of synthesising Vitamin A turned out to be incorrect, he withdrew from further scientific research.

Snow served in several senior civil service positions: as technical director of the Ministry of Labour from 1940 to 1944, and as a civil service commissioner from 1945 to 1960. He was appointed a Commander of the Order of the British Empire (CBE) in the 1943 New Year Honours.

During WWII he was involved in training scientists for radar work and helping to cull the British contingent for the Manhattan Project. Snow was among the 2,300 names of prominent persons listed on the Nazis' Special Search List, of those who were to be arrested on the invasion of Great Britain and turned over to the Gestapo.

In 1944, he was appointed director of scientific personnel for the English Electric Company. Later he became physicist-director. In this capacity he was to employ his former student Eric Eastwood.

In the 1957 New Year Honours he was knighted, having the honour conferred by Queen Elizabeth II on 12 February, and was created a life peer, as Baron Snow, of the City of Leicester, on 29 October 1964. As a politician, Snow was parliamentary secretary in the House of Lords to the Minister of Technology from 1964 to 1966 in the Labour government of Harold Wilson.

Snow married the novelist Pamela Hansford Johnson in 1950; they had one son. Friends included the mathematician G. H. Hardy, for whom he would write a biographical foreword in A Mathematician's Apology, the physicist Patrick Blackett, the X-ray crystallographer J. D. Bernal, the cultural historian Jacques Barzun and the polymath George Steiner. At Christ's College he tutored H. S. Hoff – later better known as the novelist William Cooper. The two became friends, worked together in the civil service and wrote versions of each other into their novels: Snow was the model for the college dean, Robert, in Cooper's Scenes from Provincial Life sequence. In 1960, Snow gave the Godkin Lectures at Harvard University, about the clashes between Henry Tizard and F. Lindemann (later Lord Cherwell), both scientific advisors to British governments around the time of the Second World War. The lectures were subsequently published as Science and Government. For the academic year 1961 to 1962, Snow and his wife both served as Fellows on the faculty in the Center for Advanced Studies at Wesleyan University.

=== Literary work ===
C. P. Snow in 1969, pictured in The New York Times

Snow's first novel was a whodunit, Death under Sail (1932). In 1975 he wrote a biography of Anthony Trollope. He is better known as the author of a sequence of novels entitled Strangers and Brothers in which he depicts intellectuals in modern academic and government settings. The best-known of the sequence is The Masters. It deals with the internal politics of a Cambridge college as it prepares to elect a new master. With the appeal of an insider's view, the novel depicts concerns other than the strictly academic that influence decisions of supposedly objective scholars. The Masters and The New Men were jointly awarded the James Tait Black Memorial Prize in 1954. Corridors of Power added a phrase to the language of the day. In 1974, Snow's novel In Their Wisdom was shortlisted for the Booker Prize. Snow was nominated for the Nobel Prize in Literature multiple times in 1961, 1963, 1964, 1965, 1967, 1970 and 1971.

In The Realists, an examination of the work of eight novelists – Stendhal, Honoré de Balzac, Charles Dickens, Fyodor Dostoevsky, Leo Tolstoy, Benito Pérez Galdós, Henry James and Marcel Proust – Snow makes a robust defence of the realistic novel.

The storyline of his novel The Search is referred to in Dorothy L. Sayers's Gaudy Night and is used to help elicit the criminal's motive.

=== The Two Cultures ===
On 7 May 1959, Snow delivered a Rede Lecture called The Two Cultures, which provoked "widespread and heated debate". Subsequently, published as The Two Cultures and the Scientific Revolution, the lecture argued that the breakdown of communication between the "two cultures" of modern society – the sciences and the humanities – was a major hindrance to solving the world's problems. In particular, Snow argues that the quality of education in the world is on the decline. He wrote:

A good many times I have been present at gatherings of people who, by the standards of the traditional culture, are thought highly educated and who have with considerable gusto been expressing their incredulity at the illiteracy of scientists. Once or twice I have been provoked and have asked the company how many of them could describe the Second Law of Thermodynamics. The response was cold: it was also negative. Yet I was asking something which is about the scientific equivalent of: 'Have you read a work of Shakespeare's?'

I now believe that if I had asked an even simpler question – such as, What do you mean by mass, or acceleration, which is the scientific equivalent of saying, 'Can you read?' – not more than one in ten of the highly educated would have felt that I was speaking the same language. So the great edifice of modern physics goes up, and the majority of the cleverest people in the western world have about as much insight into it as their Neolithic ancestors would have had.

The satirists Flanders and Swann used the first part of this quotation as the basis for their short monologue and song, "First and Second Law".

As delivered in 1959, Snow's Rede Lectures specifically condemned the British educational system, as having since the Victorian period over-rewarded the humanities (especially Latin and Greek) at the expense of science education. He believed that in practice this deprived British elites (in politics, administration, and industry) of adequate preparation for managing the modern scientific world. By contrast, Snow said, German and American schools sought to prepare their citizens equally in the sciences and humanities, and better scientific teaching enabled those countries' rulers to compete more effectively in a scientific age. Later discussion of The Two Cultures tended to obscure Snow's initial focus on differences between British systems (of both schooling and social class) and those of competing countries.

Snow was attacked by F. R. Leavis in his Richmond Lecture of 1962 whose subject was "The Two Cultures", something that has come to be referred to as "the two cultures controversy". Although it was seen as a personal attack against Snow, Leavis maintained that he was targeting how public debates worked.

=== Publications ===
Coat of arms of The Lord Snow
- Crest: A telescope fesswise between two pens in saltire Proper.
- Shield: Azure semy of snow crystals Proper.
- Supporters: On either side a Siamese Cat Proper.
- Motto: Aut Inveniam Viam Aut Faciam

==== Strangers and Brothers series ====
- George Passant (first published as Strangers and Brothers), 1940
- The Light and the Dark, 1947
- Time of Hope, 1949
- The Masters, 1951
- The New Men, 1954
- Homecomings, 1956
- The Conscience of the Rich, 1958
- The Affair, 1959
- Corridors of Power, 1964
- The Sleep of Reason, 1968
- Last Things, 1970

==== Other fiction ====
- Death Under Sail, 1932
- New Lives for Old, 1933
- The Search, 1934
- The Malcontents, 1972
- In Their Wisdom, 1974, shortlisted for the Booker Prize
- A Coat of Varnish, 1979

==== Non-fiction ====
- The Two Cultures and the Scientific Revolution, 1959
- Science and Government, 1961, First Four Square Edition, 1963
- The Two Cultures and a Second Look, 1963
- Variety of Men: Rutherford; G. H. Hardy; H. G. Wells; Einstein; Lloyd George; Churchill; Robert Frost; Dag Hammarskjöld; Stalin, 1967
- The State of Siege, 1968
- Public Affairs, 1971
- Trollope: His Life and Art, 1975
- The Realists: Portraits of Eight Novelists, 1978 (Balzac; Dickens; Dostoevsky; Galdos; Henry James; Proust; Stendhal; Tolstoy)
- The Physicists: A Generation that Changed the World, 1981

Academic offices
| Preceded by Baron Boothby | Rector of the University of St Andrews; 1961–1964 | Succeeded by John Rothenstein |
