= Arena (disambiguation) =

An arena is an enclosed area that showcases theatre, musical performances or sporting events.

Arena, ARENA, or the Arena may also refer to:

== Populated places ==
=== United States ===
- Point Arena, California
- Arena Township, Lac qui Parle County, Minnesota
- Arena, North Dakota
- Arena (town), Wisconsin
  - Arena, Wisconsin, village within the town

=== Other countries ===
- Arena, Saskatchewan, Canada
- Arena, Iran
- Arena, Calabria, Italy
- La Arena District, Peru
- San Juan de la Arena, Spain

== Stadiums and venues ==
- 2300 Arena, multipurpose sports venue in Philadelphia, Pennsylvania
- Arena, Vienna, cultural centre
- The Arena, purpose-built arena in Yas Island, Abu Dhabi
- The Arena (Ahmedabad) (EKA Arena), multi-purpose stadium in Ahmedabad, Gujarat, India
- The Arena, Ottawa, former indoor ice hockey arena in Canada
- The Arena, Miami, home stadium of the NBA's Miami Heat
- Erste Bank Arena, indoor sports stadium in Vienna
- Generali Arena (Vienna), former name of football stadium Franz Horr Stadium
- HWS Arena, sports and music venue in Poznań, Poland
- Johan Cruyff Arena, home stadium of football club AFC Ajax in Amsterdam, the Netherlands
- Playtime Filoil Centre, indoor arena in the Philippines which was inaugurated as The Arena
- Pula Arena, amphitheatre in Croatia
- St. Louis Arena, former indoor arena in St. Louis, Missouri, US
- Verona Arena, a Roman amphitheatre in Verona, Italy
- Vienna Watersports Arena, artificial whitewater venue

== Arts and media ==
=== Film ===
- Arena (1953 film), a 3-D Western starring Gig Young
- The Arena (1974 film), a gladiator B-movie starring Pam Grier
- Arena (1989 film), a science fiction film starring Paul Satterfield and Claudia Christian
- The Arena (2001 film), a direct-to-video remake of the 1974 film from producer Roger Corman
- Arena (2009 film), a Portuguese short film
- Arena (2011 film), an American film
- Arena (2013 film), a Russian film

=== Gaming ===
- Arena Entertainment, a Mirrorsoft video game label
- ArenaNet, a computer game developer and part of NCsoft Corporation
- Quake III Arena, a multiplayer first-person shooter released on December 2, 1999
- The Elder Scrolls: Arena, the first game in The Elder Scrolls series, released in 1994
- Wing Commander Arena, a multiplayer Xbox 360 game
- Arena, a gameplay mode for Team Fortress 2
- OpenArena, a multiplayer, free, and open source first-person shooter
- Magic: The Gathering Arena, a video game adaptation of the Magic: The Gathering card game

=== Music ===
- Arena (Duran Duran album), a 1984 live album by Duran Duran
- Arena (Asia album), 1996, by the band Asia
- Arena (Todd Rundgren album), a 2008 album by Todd Rundgren
- Arena (An Absurd Notion), a 1985 concert film by Duran Duran
- Arena (band), a British progressive rock band
- Arena rock, a form of rock music
- Arena di Verona Festival, an opera festival in Verona, Italy
- "The Arena", a 1966 song by Al Hirt

=== Printed works ===
- "Arena" (short story), a 1944 science fiction story by Fredric Brown
- Countdown: Arena, a comic book series, published in 2007 by DC Comics
- Arena, a 2013 novel by Simon Scarrow and T.J. Andrews
- The Arena (novel), a 1962 suspense novel by William Haggard
- Arena (novel), a 1994 fantasy novel by William R. Forstchen

=== Periodicals ===
- Arena (magazine), a British style and entertainment magazine for men
- Arena (Swedish magazine), on culture and politics
- Arena Three, a British magazine for homosexual women published by the Minorities Research Group
- The Arena (magazine), a 1899–1909 American liberal literary and political magazine
- Arena (publishing co-operative), an independent Australian publishing cooperative
- L'Arena, Italian newspaper

=== Television ===
- Arena (TV platform), a German pay TV network
- Arena (TV channel), an Australian cable channel
- "Arena" (Star Trek: The Original Series), a 1967 episode of Star Trek
- Arena (British TV series), a long-running BBC British documentary television series
- The Arena (TV series), a debate-style television show produced in Singapore
- Astro Arena (TV channel), Malaysian pay-TV channel
- Arena (miniseries), a 1976 Australian miniseries
- "The Arena" (Studio One), an episode of Studio One

== Organizations ==
- Arena Football League, an American indoor football league
- Arena Pharmaceuticals, a biopharmaceutical company in San Diego, California
- Australian Renewable Energy Agency, a government agency
- National Renewal Alliance Party, a former political party of Brazil
- Nationalist Republican Alliance, a political party of El Salvador

== People ==
=== Given name ===
- Arena Williams (born 1990), New Zealand politician

=== Surname ===
- Anthony Arena, American soccer player
- Bruce Arena (born 1951), American soccer coach
- Chris Arena, American singer-songwriter and producer
- Danielle Laraque-Arena, American pediatrician, academician and administrator
- Felice Arena, Australian children's writer
- Gildo Arena (1921–2005), Italian water polo player and freestyle swimmer
- Jack Arena, American ice hockey coach
- James Arena-DeRosa, American politician
- John Arena, American politician
- Kelli Arena, American television journalist
- Kenny Arena, American soccer player
- Kiira Dosdall-Arena, American ice hockey player
- Lello Arena (born 1953), Italian actor
- Maria Arena Bell, American writer
- Marie Arena (born 1966), Belgian politician
- Maurizio Arena (1933–1979), Italian actor
- Romina Arena (born 1980), Italian-American singer-songwriter
- Sammy Arena, American music artist
- Tina Arena (born 1967), Australian singer
- Tony Arena, American football player
- Walter Arena (born 1964), Italian race walker

== Computing ==
- Arena.ai, an AI evaluation platform that compares AI chatbots based on votes
- Arena (software), simulation software
- Arena (web browser), developed by the W3C for testing support for HTML 3 and Cascading Style Sheets
- Arena allocation, a memory management technique that allows for efficient deallocation
- Are.na, online social networking community

== Sports ==
- Arena football, a variety of gridiron football
  - Arena Football League, an American indoor football league
- Arena (swimwear), an Italian brand of competitive swimwear

== Other uses ==
- Arena (countermeasure), a Russian active protection system for tanks
- Arena station (UTA) in Salt Lake City
- Arena tram stop (Croydon) in the London Borough of Croydon
- Arena tram stop (Sheffield) on the Sheffield Supertram network in Sheffield, UK
- Suzuki APV Arena, a minivan

== See also ==
- Arenafilms, an Australian film production company
- Arenavirus, an RNA virus that mostly affects rodents
- Arene (disambiguation)
- Arenas (disambiguation)
- Larena (disambiguation)
- Bou Saâda, known as Arena during ancient times
