= Arenas =

This is a disambiguation page for the name Arenas. For the sporting event venue, see arena; for other meanings of arena, see arena (disambiguation).

Arenas (meaning sands in Spanish) may refer to:

== Persons ==
- Abbygale Arenas (born 1974), Filipina contestant in the Miss Universe 1997 pageant
- Albert Arenas (born 1996), Spanish motorcycle racer
- Braulio Arenas (1913–1988), Chilean poet and writer
- Eddie Arenas (1935–2003), Filipino actor
- Elena Arenas (born 2001), American artistic gymnast
- Gabriel Fernández Arenas (born 1983), Spanish footballer
- Gilbert Arenas (born 1982), American professional basketball player
- Ildefonso Arenas (born 1947), Spanish writer
- Jacobo Arenas (1924–1990), nom de guerre of Luis Morantes, founder and ideological leader of the Colombian FARC-EP
- Javier Arenas (American football) (born 1987), American football player
- Javier Arenas (politician) (born 1957), Spanish politician
- Juan Pablo Arenas (born 1987), Chilean soccer player
- Julio Arenas (born 1993), Spanish sprinter
- Reinaldo Arenas (1943–1990), Cuban poet, novelist, and playwright
- Rose Marie Arenas (born 1940), Filipina socialite and philanthropist
- Yolanda Arenas, Cuban actress

== Places ==
- Arenas, Málaga, Spain
- Arenas de San Juan, Ciudad Real, Spain
- Arenas de San Pedro, Ávila, Spain
- Arenas, Panama
- Punta Arenas, a city in Chile
- Arenas, Cidra, Puerto Rico
- Arenas, Utuado, Puerto Rico

== Other ==
- Arenas CD, a football team in Andalusia, Spain
- Arenas Club de Getxo, a football club in Guecho, Spain
- Toronto Arenas, a professional hockey team in Toronto, Canada
- Arenas River (disambiguation)

== See also ==
- Arena (disambiguation)
- Arenas River (disambiguation)
- Larena (disambiguation), for Larenas
