= Gary John Previts =

American accountant and professor

Gary John Previts (born 1942) an American accountant, is a Distinguished University Professor Emeritus at Case Western Reserve University (Cleveland, Ohio USA). From 1979 to June 30, 2023, he was Professor of Accountancy in the Weatherhead School of Management teaching undergraduate, masters, and doctoral courses. He is known for his work on the history of the theory and practice of accountancy.

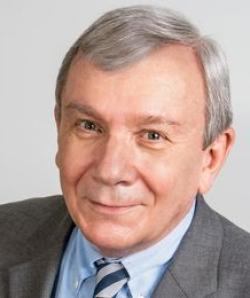
Photo of Gary Previts

== Biography ==
=== Youth, education and military service ===
Previts was born in Cleveland, Ohio. In 1939 his father, Julius A. Previts, received a master's degree from Teachers College, Columbia University and was a faculty member in the Cleveland Municipal School District. After obtaining a BA in 1963 from John Carroll University, under the guidance of Professor of Accounting F.J. McGurr, he obtained his MA in accounting at The Ohio State University in 1964. In 1972 under the guidance of Williard E. Stone, he received a PhD at the University of Florida. He holds a CPA license in Ohio and Alabama.

In 2012 he acquired the Chartered Global Management Accountant (CGMA) designation through the AICPA Pathway.

Previts served as a US Army Officer (1965–67). In 1967 during the Vietnam War he was stationed in Thailand. Back in the States he worked at Haskins & Sells, now Deloitte, before accepting an appointment as an assistant professor of business in 1968.

=== Career ===
Following his military service he was a professor at Augusta College, Georgia [now Augusta University]. After completing his doctoral studies Previts accepted an appointment at the University of Alabama in late 1972. During the first year of his academic career, Previts was instrumental in generating interest in the formation of the Academy of Accounting Historians, devoted to the study of accounting history.

He was first President of the Academy of Accounting Historians and a founding editor of the Accounting Historians Journal in 1974. He is currently a trustee and serves on the Editorial Review Board of the journal. Previts is also a member of the Editorial Review Board of the Journal of Accounting and Free Enterprise, starting this position 2014, and the editor of the Studies in the Development of Accounting Thought book series published by Emerald Press (UK). He served for thirty years as the editor of Research in Accounting Regulation. Additionally, Previts was a guest editor for "Abacus" from 1988 to 2011. He also served as President of the American Accounting Association (2007–8). In 1979, Previts was appointed a professor of Accountancy in the Weatherhead School of Management at Case Western Reserve University, where from 2007 to 2022 he held an appointment as the E. Mandell deWindt Professor.

Previts was inducted into the Accounting Hall of Fame in 2011. In that same year he was given the title Distinguished University Professor at CWRU. In 2007 he received the American Institute of Certified Public Accountants Gold Medal for Service and in 2018 the American Accounting Association awarded him its lifetime service award.

=== Personal ===
Previts is married to Frances Anne (Porubsky) a graduate of Notre Dame College, South Euclid, Ohio. She was a research associate in hypertensive research at the Cleveland Clinic and the Medical College of Georgia, prior to dedicating her time to the development of their children. They have four adult children and twelve grandchildren. He is a member of Council 4083 of the Knights of Columbus, Tuscaloosa AL and a life member of the Veterans of Foreign Wars.

== Work ==
=== Institutional development of accounting ===
Previts' research interests are varied and include studies of regulatory institutions, biographical studies and focus on the "development of accounting thought and institutions... the corporate origins and ongoing events that have shaped contemporary accounting practices... [and on] the regulation of accounting disclosures." Previts and several coauthors have consistently contributed to the literature of the discipline.

His most frequent coauthor is Professor Dale L. Flesher, of the University of Mississippi. He also wrote several papers with the late Professors Edward N. Coffman and William Samson. Along with Flesher and other coauthors he has published many papers on the accounting practices of 19th century U.S. railroads.

In addition to faculty mentors noted above, he studied historical topics with Professor William Woodruff, while at the University of Florida. Woodruff's works including The Impact of Western Man, America's Impact on the World, Vessel of Sadness, and a Concise History of the Modern World, are among the writings which Previts identifies as influential in developing views which he employs. He was a pupil in several doctoral seminars offered by Ralph Hamilton Blodgett, the classical economist.

Also while a student in the PhD program at the University of Florida, Previts took coursework from both Harvey Theodore Deinzer, a pupil of William A. Paton of Michigan and then a professor at Florida and Lawrence Benninger, a student of DR Scott, University of Missouri, then a professor at Florida.

From Deinzer he gained an appreciation for the pragmaticism of John Dewey, and from Deinzer's work Development of Accounting Thought (Holt Rinehart 1965) he gained an appreciation for Dewey's truth definition of "warranted assertability". Benninger's dedication to the works of Scott led Previts to an awareness of the ‘cultural significance of accounting’ paraphrasing the title of DR Scott's well known work. Previous to Previts studies at Florida in the early 1970s, two earlier Florida doctoral recipients Robert R. Sterling and Richard Vangermeersch, would also be important sources of support and knowledge. From 1978 through 2024 he had frequent interactions and an opportunity to appreciate the accomplishments of J. Michael Cook, another Florida graduate, who led the transformation of Haskins & Sells into Deloitte, and who is a member of the Accounting Hall of Fame.

Sterling would have by this time become strongly influenced by Thomas Kuhn's work on scientific revolutions, and Sterling's support for taking up new approaches to thinking were influential. The use of the term paradigm is associated with Kuhn and influenced Sterling's work. Vangermeersch, who spent his career at the University of Rhode Island, pioneered many important studies and published extensively, leading up to his coeditorship of the 1996 Garland volume, "The History of Accounting: An International Encyclopedia."

=== Early development ===
Previts attended the first American Accounting Association doctoral consortium at the University of Kentucky in 1971 and met many of the up-and-coming academics of that era at that event. Upon his first academic appointment at the University of Alabama, Previts was mentored by S. Paul Garner, who along with W. Baker Flowers and Robert Sweeney, two other doctoral alums of the University of Texas at Austin, were supportive of historical work, at a time when focused positivist efforts for quantitative – empirical archival work were burgeoning.

Flowers arranged for Previts to conduct the doctoral seminar on accounting history at Alabama, and Garner was a guiding and supporting influence on Previts effort in establishing the Academy of Accounting Historians in 1973 at the formative meeting at Laval University in Quebec. Sweeney as chair of the faculty led the establishment of the school of accountancy at Alabama and supported Previts in developing roles at the American Institute of CPAs and in the American Accounting Association.

At Alabama Previts and Paul Garner were involved in supervising the dissertation of Barbara Dubis Merino, who later, with Previts, co-authored the first two versions of a history of accountancy in the United States, first published by Ronald Press in 1979 and then revised and published by The Ohio State University Press in 1998.

While a master of accounting student at The Ohio State University Previts met Lawrence Phillips, a doctoral candidate who had received his prior degrees at Case Western Reserve University (CWRU) in Previts's home town of Cleveland, Ohio. In February 1979 Phillips contacted Previts and encouraged him to consider an appointment at CWRU. Dean Theodore Alfred and Previts reviewed the possibilities for establishing a Professional Accountancy Program at CWRU to provide a Master of Accountancy degree.

=== Professor at CWRU ===
Previts was appointed a full professor on the CWRU faculty in the summer of 1979, with very mixed feelings about leaving Alabama colleagues, friends and neighbors. Yet he perceived an opportunity to work to develop the accountancy programs at CWRU, a member school of the Association of American Universities (AAU), which Andrew D. Braden, who was approaching retirement, had been overseeing for many years.

At CWRU Previts took over the advanced financial theory seminar transforming it into a critical thinking focused offering, with an emphasis on appreciation for the role of theory in accounting practice and in developing recognition for the role of history in understanding contemporary issues. He was involved in that course and in the doctoral seminar in accounting history over the forty-four years on the faculty at CWRU. At CWRU, he also refined his teaching interests to the areas of financial accounting, regulation, disclosure and analysis; accounting history; and business history. With his research at CWRU, he focused on development of accounting thought and institutions, regulation and analysis of corporate disclosure, and education policy.

He especially learned from colleagues such as Bob Colson, an Ohio State PHD, whose career would span many organizational and editorial roles, and Scott S. Cowen, an accounting colleague who became the school's dean, and later President of Tulane University. Bob impressed upon Previts the importance of tenure in academe as the equivalent of 'equity ownership' and a responsibility not merely an earned privilege. Cowen impressed upon him the role of contingency theory, and the need to have multiple courses of action or options for any important course of change.

Timothy Fogarty who came to the faculty a decade later was a constant source of intellectual activity, and provided a sociological perspective to accounting research. Larry Parker was a central figure in supporting the development of graduate study in accountancy. These two colleagues' signature activities are ascribed to these years.

In addition, during this time, his consideration of the writings of the late Professors Michael Chatfield, and a relationship with the late Professor Orace Johnson occurred. Both were impressive scholars. While they were not campus colleagues, Previts learned much from observing them at a first gathering with both at the AAA meetings at the University of Kentucky mentioned earlier.

It was there that he first identified the simple relationship which exists between what “WAS” (historical perspective), what “IS” (positivist thinking) and what “OUGHT TO BE” (normative thinking). He based his teaching upon pointing out to students that relationships between what “WAS” and what “IS” and what “OUGHT” to be are necessary to permit a comprehensive understanding of what is truthful.

During this period, Richard Mattessich shared with Previts the writings of Percy Williams Bridgman (1882–1961), in particular, the paper in "The Yale Review" during WW2 wherein Bridgman defined his view of the scientific method as “doing one's damndest with one's mind, no holds barred.” This view, and pragmatism opened in Previts' mind an appreciation for the need for entrepreneurial intellectual activities, not merely compliant doctrinaire approaches to truth seeking.

While team-teaching an MBA history course on American business in the 1990s and early 2000s, Previts met and worked with David Hammack of the CWRU History Faculty and Eric Neilsen, a colleague in Weatherhead's organizational behavior area. For a decade Previts steeped himself not only in the financial and capital market aspects of US history but in the work areas of these two colleagues which included writings of Alfred D. Chandler, Jr., whom Previts had corresponded with since the 1970s, and also the writings of John Steele Gordon, which provided materials which Previts would employ in advanced undergraduate seminars on the topic. During his years at CWRU he has served as an invited lecturer or program presenter at Carnegie Mellon University, Said Business School Oxford University, the University of Edinburgh Business School and Columbia University.

These broader views of historical context and their implications for accounting history became fully appreciated over time. They led to the explication that the notions of property rights and human rights as enabled and evolving. These rights are fundamental to the culture and social contracts of the U.S. system. And more recently, having identified James Fenimore Cooper's The American Democrat (1838, p. 42), he recognized the premise that the right to own private productive property did not extend to ownership of human beings. Further reflection upon the notion of implied inalienable rights led to papers published in "Research in Accounting Regulation" in the 1990s about an important "right to information" needed to insure that the investing public as ultimate capital providers of the late 20th and 21st century were given relevant, reliable and timely information on the use and performance of their capital in an investment fund institution driven equity market. The rise of individual 401k retirement plans in the face of declining traditional pension arrangements added to the need to focus upon investment fund roles and their operations in capital markets.

The notion of information rights as a source theory for accounting disclosures in today's capital markets was supported in his reflections of the writings of Thomas McCraw and in McCraw's award-winning work, "Prophets of Regulation". In particular he found the work of Charles Francis Adams and McCraw's view that effective regulation involved developing a rationale for the "public use of private interests" to be meaningful. During the 30 years which Previts served as editor of Research in Accounting Regulation (Elsevier), he attempted to develop awareness of the notion of information rights and also of the interface between regulation and accounting practice.

Previts leveraged the advice once given to him by Katherine Schipper as to editorial attitudes, which Schipper had attributed to e.e.cummings, namely to assess whether a manuscript was new, true and interesting. During periods of administrative service at CWRU as both a department chair for 10 years and an associate dean for 13 years, Previts shared his thoughts in a unique ‘Decalogue’ of best practices derived from his early experiences. The most important perhaps may have been to remind administrators that if there was something important they wanted to recall they should WRITE IT DOWN, especially with regard to resource allocations. A corollary to administrators is to recognize that in such roles "your time is not your own, but belongs to those who are intended to be served in that role."

His professional service and activities include as a research team leader for the AICPA Jenkins Committee in the 1990s, and a research team leader for the Financial Accounting Standards Boards' disclosure study 2000–2. As part of his AICPA service he worked with other members as the convener of a group which developed the protocol to extend the recognition of authoritative standing for accounting standards to the Federal Accounting Standards Advisory Board [FASAB] in 1998–9. He served as the chair of the Human Capital subcommittee of the U.S. Treasury's Advisory Committee on the Auditing Profession in 2007–8. Additional service included President of the Ohio Society of CPAs 1993–4, and AICPA Board Member 1995–97. Along with other key individuals including Dr. George Krull, Dr. Tracey Sutherland and Dennis Reigle, he assisted in the formation and oversight of the operations of the Pathways Commission, formed by the AICPA and the American Accounting Association [AAA], an activity which was chaired by Professor Bruce Behn, University of Tennessee 2010–2012. Along with others he has served as a member of the Accountability Advisory Council [AAC] of the United States General Accountability Office, beginning in 2001 to date. From 2023 to 2026 he served as Chair of the AAC. He also served as a member of the Advisory Council of the Public Company Accounting Oversight Board [PCAOB] from 2007 to 2017. From 1984 to 2017, Previts was also an Accreditation Team Member and Focus Group Advisory Member for The Association to Advance Collegiate Schools of Business (AACSB). During this period, he also has served as a technical advisor to the International Accounting Education Standards Board (IAESB)

== Selected publications ==
- Previts, Gary John. The Scope of CPA Services: A Study of the Development of the Concept of Independence and the Profession's Role in Society. Ronald Press, 1985.
- Magill, Harry T., and Gary John Previts. CPA professional responsibilities: An introduction. South-Western Pub, 1991.
- Coffman, Edward N., Rasoul H. Tondkar, and Gary John Previts. Historical perspectives of selected financial accounting topics. Richard D. Irwin, Inc., 1993.
- Previts, Gary John, and Barbara D. Merino. History of Accountancy in the United States: The Cultural Significance of Accounting. Ohio State University Press, 1998.

Articles, a selection

- Previts, Gary John, Lee D. Parker, and Edward N. Coffman. "Accounting history: definition and relevance." Abacus 26.1 (1990): 1–16.
- Previts, Gary John, Lee D. Parker, and Edward N. Coffman. "An accounting historiography: subject matter and methodology." Abacus 26.2 (1990): 136–158.
- Previts, G. J., Bricker, R. J., Robinson, T. R., & Young, S. J. "A content analysis of sell-side financial analyst company reports." Accounting Horizons 8 (1994): 55–70.
- Previts, Gary John, and Robert Bricker. "Fact and Theory in Accounting History: Presentmindedness and Capital Market Research*." Contemporary Accounting Research 10.2 (1994): 625–641.

Beyond publications, Previts presented seminars at the Said Business School of Oxford University and the School of Business at Edinburgh University in 2014. More recently, he has presented at conferences at Columbia University and in Italy.
