= Abdulla Issa =

Palestinian poet

- عبدالله عيسى
- Born: 15 January 1964 (age 62); Yarmouk Camp, Syria
- Occupations: poet, first Secretary of the Embassy of the State of Palestine, journalist, political analyst, film producer
- Writing career
- Period: 2003 – (Hazi)
- Genre: Poetry

Abdulla Issa (Arabic: عبدالله عيسى, Russian Abedalla Iesa or Abdalla Isa; born 15 January 1964) is a Palestinian poet, First Secretary of the Embassy of the State of Palestine, journalist, political analyst, film producer, winner of several literary awards, and recognized as a national Palestinian poet. He is known as one of the representatives of "the poetry of updates".

== Biography ==
Abdulla was born in the Yarmouk Camp near Damascus in Syria. He is the oldest of the thirteen children of Mahmoud and Fauzia. His family is of Kurdish background and originates from the Sultan of Salah ad-Din Yusuf. His family was banished to Syria after the capture of his father's village Akrad, Palestine during the 1948 Arab–Israeli War.

He began to study the Quran and classical Arabic poetry (in the camp there were only two books, the Quran and a collection of poems by Mahmoud Darwish). As a child he was greatly affected by a visit from Yasser Arafat in 1976 to the camp and later he devoted many of his verses to Arafat. After finishing secondary school in Damascus in 1982, he studied at the Economic Institute. During his studies he worked in the Department of Culture and Literature's Central Arabian magazine Freedom.

In 1984 he became the laureate of the "New Arabian poetry", and at the age of 21 he published his first collection of poems in Arabic, the Last part. From 1985-1989 he was editor of the magazine New tomorrow, becoming a laureate of the prize of the Union of writers of the Arab countries in 1986. His father worked in the City Hall of Damascus and in 1987 was killed by Palestinians in the course of the inter-Palestinian political conflict. After the assassination of his father Abdullah became head of the family.

In 1989 he moved to the Soviet Union where he began to study Russian at the preparatory courses at Moscow State University. In 1991 in Moscow he led the Palestinian Democratic Union under the direction of the Palestine Liberation Organization (PLO). From 1993 to 2003 he was the editor for cultural programs at TV and radio company "Voice of Russia". authoring programs about Russian and Arabian culture.

In 1994 he was an editor of the literary magazine "Poets". In 1995 he graduated from the Maxim Gorky Literature Institute with the separation of "Poetry". In 2001 he defended his thesis at the Institute of Asian and African Countries on "Means of artistic expression of the Arabic 'New poetry': the Second Half of the 20th century". In 2002 he became an Academic of the Academy of "Eurasia" at UNESCO. Since 1998 he has been Secretary General of the International Arab Union of journalists and writers.

From 2003 he has been the Editor-in-Chief of the Russian agency of the Iranian-Arab TV channel "Al-Alam" and a political analyst on the Russian and Arab worlds.

In 2004 the Russian security services asked him for help in negotiations with the militants during the Beslan school siege when several hostages were taken at a school which led to a documentary film series Beslan.

From 2005 to 2009 he worked as the producer of series of documentaries for the television network Al Jazeera (Their archives and our history, and Meeting in exile). From 2007 to 2009 worked as the Chief Editor of the Russian office of the Arab News Agency "ANA". In 2010 he was an executive producer of the feature film Ispytanie smertyu directed by Vladimir Nakhabtsev. The movie is about Soviet Intelligence Officer Alexei Kozlov, starring Oleg Taktarov. In the same year became an executive producer of the feature film Encounters: the True story. Tehran-43 directed by Vladimir Nakhabtsev about Soviet Intelligence Officer Gevork Vartanian and his wife Goar Vartanian.

From 2012 to 2013 he was director of the film documentary project Muslims are proud of Russia. The project is aimed at real-world examples to show that there is no conflict between the terms "Muslim" and "Russian patriot". In 2013 he directed and co-produced "And we love life" about the life of the blockade of Gaza, Palestine, with the participation of the Prime Minister of Gaza Ismail Haniyeh, and executive producer Ramil Khayrulin. The film is somewhere between fiction and documentary: it is a mix of invented script and characters, filmed within the backdrop of real-life situations and emotions of the people who survived the tragedy.

In 2015, he became the First Secretary of the Embassy of the State of Palestine and received the highest award of the State of Palestine for "Achievement in Culture, Art and Science - The Degree of the Creator".

== Poetry ==
- 1985 – Last part (Hazi)
- 1987 – Dead are prepared for burial (Mauta youidduna aljanaza)
- 1996 – Alaaa (Benefit of divine) (Alaa)
- 1997 – Ink of the first heaven (Hibr al-samaa al- ula)
- 2000 – Rise of the fences (Kiamatu alaswar)
- 2013 – Shepherds of the sky, the shepherds of grass (Ruaatalsamaa ruaat algufla)
- 2014 – Father is my brothers, not a wolf (Ikhwati ya abi la alzib)

== Books ==
- 1987 – Visions in poetry (Ruya fi Ashir)
- 2001 – Word and spirit in contemporary poetics (Alkalima ua alruh fi alshiriya almuasera)
