= Richard K. Fleischman =

American accounting scholar (1941–2020)

Richard K. Fleischman (1941 - 2020) was an American accounting scholar and Emeritus Professor of Accounting at the John Carroll University, known for his work on accounting history.

== Life and work ==
Fleischman obtained his BA in history from Harvard College, and then moved to the State University of New York Buffalo, where he obtained his MA, his PhD in history, and an MBA with an accounting emphasis.

Fleischman started his academic career at the University of Hawaii in 1969, and taught history until 1981. In 1983 he moved to the John Carroll University, where he was Professor of Accounting until his retired in 2008. From 1986 to 1994 he chaired the Department of accountancy. The academy of Accounting Historians awarded him a Life Membership.

Fleischman's research interests are in the field of history and accounting, and particularly the "UK Industrial revolution cost accounting and US municipal accounting during the Progressive Era."

== Selected publications ==
- Fleischman, Richard K. Conditions of life among the cotton workers of southeastern Lancashire, 1780-1850. Taylor & Francis, 1985.
- Fleischman, Richard K., and Lee David Parker. What is Past is Prologue: Cost Accounting in the British Industrial Revolution 1760-1850. Garland Publishing Inc., 1997.
- Fleischman, Richard K., Vaughan S. Radcliffe, and Paul A. Shoemaker, eds. Doing accounting history: Contributions to the development of accounting thought. Vol. 6. Elsevier, 2003.

Articles, a selection:

- Fleischman, Richard K., and Lee D. Parker. "Managerial accounting early in the British industrial revolution: The Carron Company, a case study." Accounting and Business Research 20.79 (1990): 211–221.
- Fleischman, Richard K., and Lee D. Parker. "British entrepreneurs and pre–industrial revolution evidence of cost management." Accounting Review (1991): 361–375.
- Fleischman, Richard K., and Thomas N. Tyson. "Cost accounting during the industrial revolution. the present state of historical knowledge1." The Economic History Review 46.3 (1993): 503–517.
- Fleischman, Richard K., Keith W. Hoskin, and Richard H. Macve. "The Boulton & Watt case: the crux of alternative approaches to accounting history?." Accounting and Business Research 25.99 (1995): 162–176.
- Fleischman, Richard K., Patti A. Mills, and Thomas N. Tyson. "A theoretical primer for evaluating and conducting historical research in accounting." Accounting History 1.1 (1996): 55–75.
