= Edward Coffman =

Edward Coffman may refer to:

- Edward M. Coffman, military historian
- Edward G. Coffman Jr. (born 1934), computer scientist
- Edward N. Coffman (1942–2014), American accounting scholar and professor of accounting
