= William Henry Brisbane House =

- U.S. National Register of Historic Places
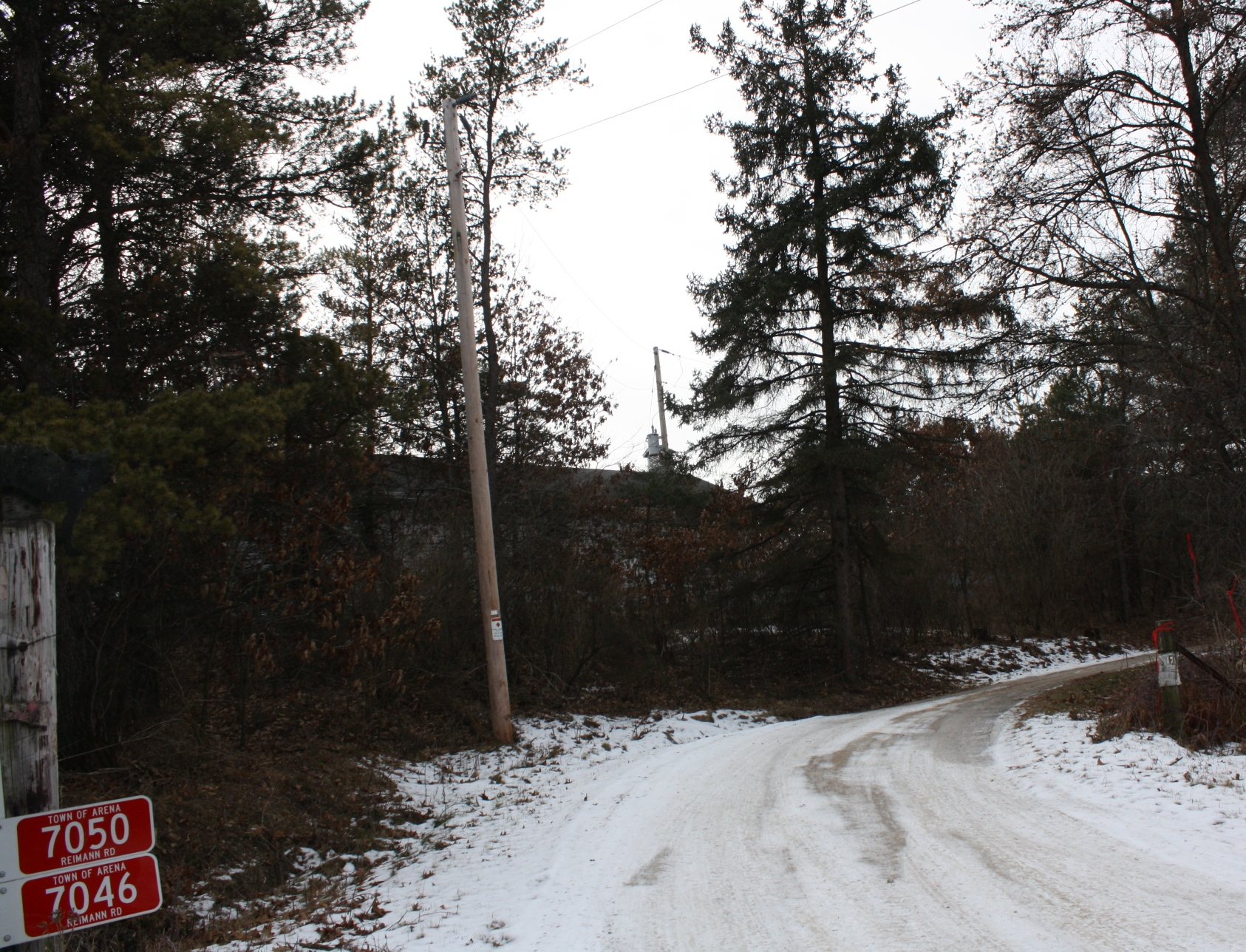
- The driveway leading to the house

- Location within Wisconsin
- Location: Reimann Rd., .6 mi. S of US 14, Arena, Wisconsin
- Coordinates: 43°09′12″N 89°54′33″W
- Area: 3.8 acres (1.5 ha)
- Built: 1868
- Architectural style: I-house
- NRHP reference No.: 90001458
- Added to NRHP: September 13, 1990

The William Henry Brisbane House is a historic house at the south end of Reimann Road near the village of Arena, Wisconsin. It was built in 1868 by William Henry Brisbane to replace an earlier house on the property, which he had owned since the 1850s. A native of South Carolina, Brisbane was a Baptist minister, a doctor, and a prominent abolitionist.

The two-and-a-half story house has an I-house plan, which was typically two rooms wide and one room deep with a symmetrical layout; though the plan was named for its popularity in the "I" states of Iowa, Illinois, and Indiana, it was much less common in neighboring Wisconsin. The house is topped by a notably steep gable roof with a pitch of 60 degrees. Brisbane lived in the house until 1877, when his failing health prompted him to move into Arena; he died the following year.

The house was added to the National Register of Historic Places on September 13, 1990.

In 2023, the "Brisbane House" was awarded the 2023 Board of Curators Restoration Award from the Wisconsin Historical Society.
