= Arene (disambiguation) =

An Arene is an organic compound.

Arene or Arenes and variants may also refer to:

- Arene (gastropod), a genus of marine snails in the family Areneidae
- Arene (mythology), two possible women in Greek mythology
- Arene, Elis, an ancient town in Elis, Greece, also known as Samiko

== People with the surname ==
- Emmanuel Arène (1856-1908), French journalist
- Isabelle Arène (born 1958), French diver
- Jean Arènes (1898–1960), French botanist who described many new species of the genus Dombeya
- Josette Arène (1924-2019), French swimmer
- Paul Arène (1843–1896), Provençal poet and French writer

== Other uses ==
- Arenes stream, a river in Spain
- Les Arènes, 1888 painting by Vincent van Gogh

== See also ==
- Aranese
- Arena (disambiguation)
