= William Henry Brisbane =

American abolitionist (1806–1878)

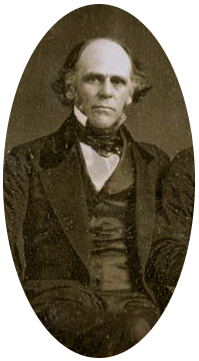

Chief Clerk of the Wisconsin Senate
- In office January 5, 1857 – January 4, 1858
- Preceded by: Byron Paine
- Succeeded by: John L. V. Thomas

Personal details
- Born: October 12, 1806 Beaufort County, South Carolina, U.S.
- Died: April 5, 1878 (aged 71) Arena, Wisconsin, U.S.
- Resting place: Mazomanie Cemetery, Mazomanie, Wisconsin
- Spouse: Glorianna Lawton (m. 1825)
- Children: Bentley Hasell Brisbane^{(1829–1846)}; Benjamin T. L. D. Brisbane^{(1834–1893)}; William Henry Brisbane Jr.^{(1838–1897)}; Phebe Adeline (Reed)^{(1841–1926)}; Mary Julia Brisbane^{(1843–1845)}

William Henry Brisbane Sr. (October 12, 1806 – April 5, 1878) was a Baptist minister of Antebellum South Carolina, who, having convinced himself of the immorality of slavery, freed and settled a group of slaves he had inherited, and became an active abolitionist.

His former home near Arena, Wisconsin, the William Henry Brisbane House, is listed in the National Register of Historic Places.

== Biography ==
His father, Adam Fowler Brisbane (1783–1830) appears, from Brisbane's own writings, to have suffered from alcoholism. He was adopted by his rich childless uncle William Brisbane (1759–1821) (whom Brisbane later described as "tho' not remarkably pious, yet one of the most excellent men I ever knew, in whom was combined almost every quality worthy of admiration") and aunt Mary Ash Deveaux (1775–1845). He married 28 May 1825 at Lawtonville Glorianna Lawton (15 July 1805 – 17 February 1878), who bore him eight recorded children, of whom three survived to adulthood.

Brisbane inherited a large number of slaves, but became convinced that slavery was wrong, and in 1835 brought 33 of them to the north, manumitting them and aiding them to settle in life. Since much of Brisbane's wealth was in slaves this act resulted in a considerable loss of income and equity. At this time many family and friends in his social circle, including rice planters, led lives that were economically dependent on slavery. Freeing his slaves and becoming an outspoken abolitionist resulted in his making enemies with many of those closest to him.

Brisbane came to his abolitionist views because of his inability to refute the claims made by an abolitionist pamphlet he received in the mail. He was especially disturbed by his inability to reconcile the values in the Constitution with those of the institution of slavery.

Because of his radical views on slavery for Antebellum South Carolina, he had to move north to Cincinnati. There he became the associate of prominent abolitionists, and a constant worker in their cause. In the decades of anti-slavery agitation before the American Civil War he was an active campaigner for abolition.

William Henry Brisbane had strong views against infidelity. He published the book The Bible Defended Against the Objections of Infidelity, Being an Examination of Scientific, Historical, Chronological and Other Scripture Difficulties.

In 1855 he moved to Wisconsin, was chief clerk of the state senate in 1857, and became pastor of the Baptist church in Madison. He was able to return to South Carolina (temporarily) as an officer of the victorious Yankees in 1864 as a tax commissioner. In June 1874, he took an active part in the reunion of the old abolition guards in Chicago.

He died at his home in Arena, Wisconsin. In 2023, the "Brisbane House" was awarded the 2023 Board of Curators Restoration Award from the Wisconsin Historical Society.

== Publications ==
- Slaveholding Examined in the Light of the Holy Bible (1847)
- The Bible Defended Against the Objections of Infidelity, Being an Examination of Scientific, Historical, Chronological and Other Scripture Difficulties (1855)

Wisconsin Senate
Preceded by Byron Paine	Chief Clerk of the Wisconsin Senate; January 5, 1857 – January 4, 1858	Succeeded by John L. V. Thomas
