= Repertorio Español =

Theater company based in New York City

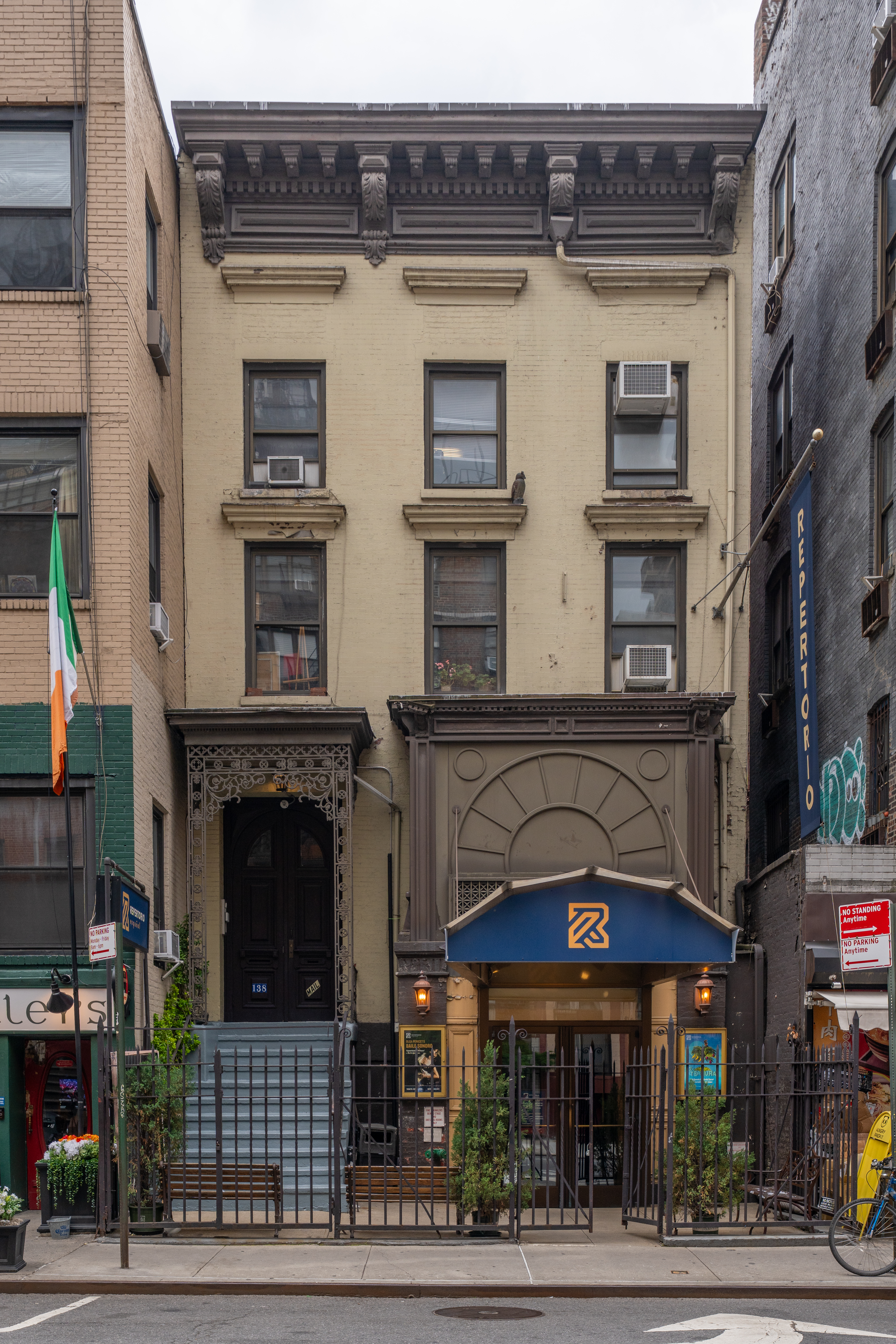
- Entrance to the Repertorio Español Theater (2026)
- Interactive map of Repertorio Español
- Address: 138 East 27th Street; Manhattan, New York City; United States
- Coordinates: 40.741646°N 73.982597°W
- Type: Off-Broadway
- Public transit: 28th Street station (6), 28th Street station (R, W), M34, M34A, M23, M102, M103

Construction
- Opened: 1968

Website
- repertorio.nyc

Repertorio Español is a theater company founded in 1968 by Producer Gilberto Zaldívar and Artistic Director René Buch to introduce the best of Latin American, Spanish, and Hispanic American theater to broad-ranging audiences in New York City and around the country. Robert Weber Federico joined the company two years later as Resident Designer and Associate Artistic Producer remained with Repertorio until 2022 when he retired as Executive Director. It owns the theater building formerly known as Grammercy Arts Theatre.

== History ==
Repertorio Español originally performed in the Greenwich Mews Theater. In 1972, Repertorio Español moved to the Gramercy Arts Theatre where the company has since remained. The company's first production, Who's Afraid of Virginia Woolf? was a critical success.

From its earliest days, Repertorio has maintained a dramatic ensemble, attracting many talented veterans and emerging Hispanic actors, including Yolanda Arenas and Ofelia González, who was the first actress to win an Obie Award without having performed in English. Another addition was Pilar Rioja in 1973. In 1980, Musical Director Pablo Zinger initiated a musical ensemble that presented zarzuelas, operas, and elegant musical anthologies.

In 1984, the company began to present and commission new plays by Hispanic American playwrights, and in 1991 it inaugurated an infrared simultaneous translation system that provides an opportunity for non-Spanish-speaking audiences to enjoy the company's vast selection of plays.

More recently, the company has expanded its repertoire to include a range of new work.

Repertorio presented the world premiere in Spanish of Nilo Cruz's Pulitzer Prize-winning drama Ana en el trópico (Anna in the Tropics). The play's cast included celebrities such as Spanish TV soap opera star Francisco Gattorno and Denise Quiñones (Miss Universe 2001).

Repertorio Español received the 2011 OBIE Award for Lifetime Achievement; a 1996 Drama Desk Special Award for presenting quality theater; a 1996 Obie Award for the play series Voces nuevas (New Voices); the New York State Governor's Award; as well as many citations by the Asociación de Cronistas de Espectáculos (ACE) and the Hispanic Organization of Latin Actors (HOLA).

As of 2017, the company had produced more than 250 plays and in 2022, Robert Federico was succeeded by Rafael Sanchez.
