= And We Love Life =

- Directed by: Abdulla Issa
- Written by: Abdulla Issa
- Produced by: Abdulla Issa; Khayrulin Ramil; Issa Issa
- Starring: Ahmad Al-Makkusi; Hazim Surur; Viam Abu Al-Anzin
- Cinematography: Aleksandr Koshelev
- Edited by: Aleksandr Koshelev
- Production companies: ART Film; TVOROG Media Group
- Release date: June 19, 2013 (Moscow)
- Running time: 65 minutes
- Country: Russia
- Language: Arabic

And We Love Life (Russian: И мы любим жизнь, Arabic: "ونحن نحب الحياة") is a 2013 Russian film, directed by Abdulla Issa.

== Synopsis ==
Young refugee Ahmad in Gaza Strip wants to be a sailor to escape from the blockade. But looking at the fate of the sailors, he realizes that the sea is surrounded by military ships. He also has great talent in playing football, but understands that to become a world star like Messi or Ronaldo as Gaza Strip destroyed the only stadium. After his father's death, Ahmed was forced to work in the workshop. Knowing that workshops are being bombed, thinking that doing Qassam rocket, he decides to become a martyr to get into paradise.

In search of paradise, he begins to understand that the great jihad is to be with his mom and sister. Then he promises his classmate to become a great actor as Omar Sharif to become an honorary ambassador of peace in the world. So the child's question: "Did the children of Israel afraid as we are?".

== Cast ==
- Ahmad - Al-Makkusi
- Hazim - Hazim Surur
- Viam - Viam Abu Al-Anzin
- A special appearance of the Prime Minister of the palestinian national authority in the Gaza Strip Ismail Haniyeh.

== About the film ==
The film tells about the difficult life of palestinians in the Gaza Strip. This is an unusual picture represents something between fiction and documentary cinema: in the framework of the invented script shows the real heroes and history, taken by real situations and emotions of the survivors of the horrible tragedy.

== Facts ==
November 29, 2013 the film was shown at the opening of the international Day of Solidarity with the Palestinian People at the United Nations (UN) in Moscow.

October 29, 2016 the film was shown at the Festival "Day of Arab culture" in the Ivanovo.
