= Thomas J. Burns =

American accounting scholar

Thomas Junior Burns (April 6, 1923 – January 10, 1996) was an American accounting scholar and professor of accounting at Ohio State University, known for his contributions to accounting education.

== Biography ==
Born in Arena, Wisconsin, Burns obtained his BA degree from University of Wisconsin, while working at the Gisholt Machine Company. From early 1943 to late 1945 he served in the United States Army in Europe during World War II. Returning to University of Wisconsin, he obtained his BBA in accounting and American history in 1950. Subsequently, he obtained his CPA license for the State of Wisconsin in 1952, his MBA from the University of Michigan in 1957, and his PhD in accounting from the University of Minnesota under Carl L. Nelson.

After his graduation in 1948, Burns worked at the Wisconsin Department of Taxation briefly, and then became controller for Lawrence University in Appleton, Wisconsin and later also lecturer. For some time in the late 1950s he also taught accounting at Southern Illinois University. Eventually in 1963 he moved to Ohio State University, where he became professor of accounting in 1967 and chair of the department from 1977 to 1981. One of his first accomplishments was the initiation of a PhD program in modern accounting. Around 1965 he also initiated the Ohio State Accounting Honors Program. Burns was also a visiting professor at the University of Chicago, Harvard University, Stanford University, and the University of California at Berkeley.

At the American Accounting Association (AAA) he served as director of education. He later was awarded the AAA Outstanding Accounting Educator Award, as well as the AICPA Outstanding Accounting Educator Award. He was inducted into the Accounting Hall of Fame in 1997.

== Selected publications ==
- Daniel L. Jensen, Edward N. Coffman, Thomas Junior Burns. Advanced accounting and the rule-making agencies, 1980.
- Burns, Thomas Junior, and Harvey S. Hendrickson. The accounting sampler. McGraw-Hill Companies, 1972.
- Burns, Thomas Junior, ed. Behavioral experiments in accounting: papers, critiques, and proceedings. College of Administrative Science, Ohio State University, 1972.

Articles, a selection:

- Burns, Thomas J.; Coffman, Edward N. (1976). "The Accounting Hall of Fame: A Profile of the Members". Journal of Accounting Research. 14 (2): 342–347. doi:10.2307/2490547. JSTOR 2490547.
