= Richard Vangermeersch =

American economist

Richard G.J. Vangermeersch (born 1940) is an American economist, and Emeritus Professor of Accounting at the University of Rhode Island, particularly known for his History of Accounting: An International Encyclopedia, edited with Michael Chatfield.

== Biography ==
Born in Providence, Rhode Island, Vangermeersch attended the North Providence High School. He obtained his BA in accounting from Bryant University, his MA in accounting in 1964 from University of Rhode Island, and his PhD in accounting in 1970 from the University of Florida with a thesis on the history of economics, economic theory and management. Finally in 1978 he obtained his Certified Management Accountant (CMA).

Vangermeersch spend his academic career at the University of Rhode Island, where he started in 1970 as Associate Professor of Accounting. In 2004 he retired and became Emeritus Professor of Accounting. From 1979 to 1984 he was treasurer of the Academy of Accounting Historians, and in 1987 he was its president.

In 1988 he and Peter McMickle were awarded the Hourglass Award for their 1987 book, The Origins of a Great Profession.

== Selected publications ==
- Vangermeersch, Richard GJ. Comments on accounting disclosures in the Baltimore and Ohio annual reports from 1828 through 1850. Academy of Accounting Historians, School of Business, Virginia Commonwealth University, 1979.
- Vangermeersch, Richard GJ. Financial reporting techniques in 20 industrial companies since 1861. University Presses of Florida, 1979.
- Vangermeersch, Richard GJ. Financial Accounting Milestones in the Annual Reports of United States Steel Corporation: The First Seven Decades. Garland Pub., 1986.
- Church, Alexander Hamilton, and Richard GJ Vangermeersch. The contributions of Alexander Hamilton Church to accounting and management. Garland, 1986.
- Chatfield, Michael, and Richard Vangermeersch, eds. The History of Accounting (RLE Accounting): An International Encyclopedia. Routledge, 1996/2014.
- Vangermeersch, Richard GJ, ed. The life and writings of Stuart Chase (1888-1985): from an accountant's perspective. Vol. 8. Elsevier, 2005.
