= Larena (disambiguation) =

Larena, L'Arena, Larenas or variant, may refer to:

== L'Arena ==
- L'Arena, Italian newspaper
- San Juan de La Arena (L'Arena), Spanish municipality

== Larena ==
- Larena, municipality in Siquijor, Philippines

Surnamed "Larena"

- Demetrio Larena, Filipino governor
- Jorge Larena (born 1981), Spanish soccer player

== Larenas ==
- Isla Larenas, Chile; see List of islands of Chile

Surnamed "Larenas"

- Mario Larenas (born 1994), Chilean soccer player
- Carlos Marcio Camus Larenas (1927-2014), Chilean bishop

== See also ==
- Arena (disambiguation)
- Arenas (disambiguation)
