= Research in Accounting Regulation =

Peer-reviewed academic journal

Research in Accounting Regulation was a peer-reviewed academic journal of accounting published by Elsevier. The editor-in-chief was Gary John Previts. The journal was established in 1987 and was abstracted and indexed by Scopus. The focus of the journal was on the role and relationship of regulatory and self-regulatory bodies on the practice and content of accounting. The journal was discontinued in 2019 following the publication of its 30th volume.
