= Academic Pediatrics =

- Discipline: Pediatrics
- Language: English
- Edited by: Peter G. Szilagyi

Publication details
- Former name(s): Ambulatory Pediatrics
- History: 2001-present
- Publisher: Elsevier
- Frequency: Bimonthly
- Impact factor: 2.993 (2021)

Standard abbreviations
- ISO 4: Acad. Pediatr.

Indexing
- ISSN: 1876-2859
- OCLC no.: 706983707

Links
- Journal homepage; Online access; Online archive

Academic Pediatrics is a bimonthly peer-reviewed medical journal covering pediatrics. It was established in 2001 as Ambulatory Pediatrics, obtaining its current name in January 2009.

It is published by Elsevier on behalf of the Academic Pediatric Association, of which it is the official journal. The editor-in-chief is Peter G. Szilagyi (University of Rochester), who replaced James M. Perrin (Harvard Medical School) in 2009. According to the Journal Citation Reports, the journal has a 2021 impact factor of 2.993.
