= Danielle Laraque-Arena =

American pediatrician, academician and administrator

President State University of New York Upstate Medical University
- In office January 1, 2016 – December 22, 2018
- Preceded by: Gregory Eastwood
- Succeeded by: Mantosh Dewan

President Academic Pediatric Association
- In office January 1, 2009 – December 31, 2010
- Preceded by: Tina L. Cheng
- Succeeded by: Janet Serwint

Personal details
- Born: Danielle Laraque; 1956 (age 69–70) Port-au-Prince, Haiti
- Spouse: Luigi Arena
- Children: 2
- Parent: Paul Laraque (father)
- Education: University of California, Los Angeles (B.S.), (M.D.)
- Occupation: Physician; academic; administrator

Academic work
- Discipline: Pediatrics
- Sub-discipline: General pediatrics, Child abuse pediatrics, Maternal-child health
- Institutions: Columbia University; New York Academy of Medicine; Mount Sinai School of Medicine; Albert Einstein College of Medicine; Maimonides Medical Center
- Notable works: Principles of Global Child Health: Education and Research (2018); Ending the War Against Children: The Rights of Children to Live Free of Violence (2021); Leadership at the Intersection of Gender and Race in Healthcare and Science (2022)

Danielle Laraque-Arena is an American physician, academic, and administrator. She is a Professor of Clinical Epidemiology and Pediatrics at the Columbia University Mailman School of Public Health and a Senior Scholar-in-Residence at the New York Academy of Medicine.

Previously, Laraque-Arena was a professor at the Albert Einstein College of Medicine and the Mount Sinai School of Medicine, as well as chair of the pediatrics department at Maimonides Medical Center. From 2016 to 2018, she was President of State University of New York Upstate Medical University, succeeding Gregory Eastwood as the first woman to hold office. In this capacity, she concurrently was Chief Executive Officer of the Upstate Health System.

Throughout her career, she has published over 120 peer-reviewed monographs, articles, and educational pamphlets including the Principles of Global Child Health: Education and Research (AAP Books, 2019), Ending the War Against Children: The Rights of Children to Live Free of Violence (Elsevier, 2021), and Leadership at the Intersection of Gender & Race in Healthcare and Science: Case Studies and Tools (Routledge, 2022).

== Early life and education ==
Danielle Laraque-Arena was born along with two brothers in Port-au-Prince, Haiti, daughter of Paul and Marcelle Laraque. Her grandparents ran a pharmacy, and her grandfather was a physician. Her father was a poet, activist, and critic of Haitian president François Duvalier. He fled Haiti for Spain in 1960 when Duvalier's police were targeting political dissidents. He then immigrated to the United States in 1961; Marcelle joined him in 1962, and their children and a grandmother joined them soon afterward, when Danielle was 7 years old. The family lived in Queens in New York City. There her father initially worked as a parking attendant at New York University and her mother became a clerk at the United Nations.

Her father took night classes to earn a bachelor's degree and took a job at Fordham Preparatory School, teaching Latin and Spanish. His position afforded Laraque-Arena tuition free enrollment at Fordham University, which she attended for two years. She spent her third year abroad at the University of Leeds in England, later transferring to the University of California, Los Angeles, where she earned a B.S. in chemistry in 1976. She then received a full-tuition scholarship to the David Geffen School of Medicine at UCLA, where she earned a Doctorate of Medicine.

== Career ==
While attending medical school, Laraque-Arena worked at Martin Luther King Jr. Community Hospital in Watts, which served Watts and Compton, both low-income areas within greater Los Angeles. She later completed her postdoctoral internship and residency at the Children's Hospital of Philadelphia.

In the mid-1980s, she joined Columbia University's faculty, where she worked at Harlem Hospital during the US's AIDS epidemic. There she developed three teams to evaluate and treat abused and neglected children. From 2000 to 2010, she worked as professor of pediatrics and of preventative medicine at Mount Sinai School of Medicine, and was the chief of the general pediatrics division, as well as vice-chair of public policy and advocacy there. She later became a professor of pediatrics at the Einstein College of Medicine, part of Yeshiva University.

Laraque-Arena was chair of the pediatrics department and a vice president of Maimonides Medical Center. She was president of State University of New York Upstate Medical University (Upstate) from January 2016 to December 2018, succeeding Gregory Eastwood as the first woman to be president. She is Professor of Clinical Epidemiology and Pediatrics at the Columbia University Mailman School of Public Health and Senior Scholar-in-Residence at the New York Academy of Medicine.

Laraque-Arena is also a prolific author, having published over 120 peer-reviewed monographs, book chapters, media resources, and educational pamphlets including the Principles of Global Child Health: Education and Research (2019), Ending the War Against Children: The Rights of Children to Live Free of Violence (2021), and Leadership at the Intersection of Gender & Race in Healthcare and Science: Case Studies and Tools (2022).

Throughout her career, she has mentored hundreds of young physicians and academics, and was on the National Academy of Medicine's Committee on Integrating Primary Care and Public Health, as well as the American Academy of Pediatrics' Board of Directors. Additionally, she is a former President of the Academic Pediatric Association and Co-chair the Governor of New York's Task Force on Maternal Mortality and Disparate Racial Outcomes. She is on the board of Prevent Child Abuse America, Women in Medicine Legacy Foundation (of which she is President), and Vaccinate Your Family (of which she was Chair).

== Personal life ==
Laraque-Arena is married to Luigi Arena, a retired radiologist. The two met while she was a freshman in college and Arena was a visiting Fulbright Scholar from Italy earning a master's degree in New York. Together they have two adult children, Marc Anthony and Julia Marie.

== Selected works ==
=== Books ===
- Principles of Global Child Health: Education and Research. American Academy of Pediatrics. 2019. ISBN 9781610021890. (with Bonita F. Stanton)
- Ending the War Against Children: The Rights of Children to Live Free of Violence. Elsevier. 2021. ISBN 9780323836104. (with Bonita F. Stanton)
- Leadership at the Intersection of Gender and Race in Healthcare and Science. Routledge. 2022. ISBN 9781032309712.

=== Essays ===
- Laraque, Danielle (February 1, 1990). "Blood Lead, Calcium Status, and Behavior in Preschool Children". Archives of Pediatrics & Adolescent Medicine. 144 (2): 186–9. doi:10.1001/archpedi.1990.02150260066030. ISSN 1072-4710. PMID 2301325.
- Laraque, D.; Arena, L.; Karp, J.; Gruskay, D. (July 1990). "Bone mineral content in black pre-schoolers: Normative data using single photon absorptiometry". Pediatric Radiology. 20 (6): 461–463. doi:10.1007/bf02075209. ISSN 0301-0449. PMID 2392364. S2CID 33225077.
- Laraque, Danielle; Barlow, Barbara; Durkin, Maureen; Howell, Joy; Cladis, Franklyn; Friedman, David; DiScala, Carla; Ivatury, Rao; Stahl, William (July 1995). "Children who are shot: A 30-year experience". Journal of Pediatric Surgery. 30 (7): 1072–1076. doi:10.1016/0022-3468(95)90344-5. ISSN 0022-3468. PMID 7472935.
- Laraque, Danielle (May 2011). "Global Child Health: Reaching the Tipping Point for All Children". Academic Pediatrics. 11 (3): 226–233. doi:10.1016/j.acap.2011.02.003. ISSN 1876-2859. PMID 21570008.
- Laraque-Arena, Danielle; Frintner, Mary Pat; Cull, William L. (May 2016). "Underserved Areas and Pediatric Resident Characteristics: Is There Reason for Optimism?". Academic Pediatrics. 16 (4): 401–410. doi:10.1016/j.acap.2015.10.004. ISSN 1876-2859. PMID 26499406.
