= Alexey Kozlov (intelligence officer) =

Soviet intelligence officer

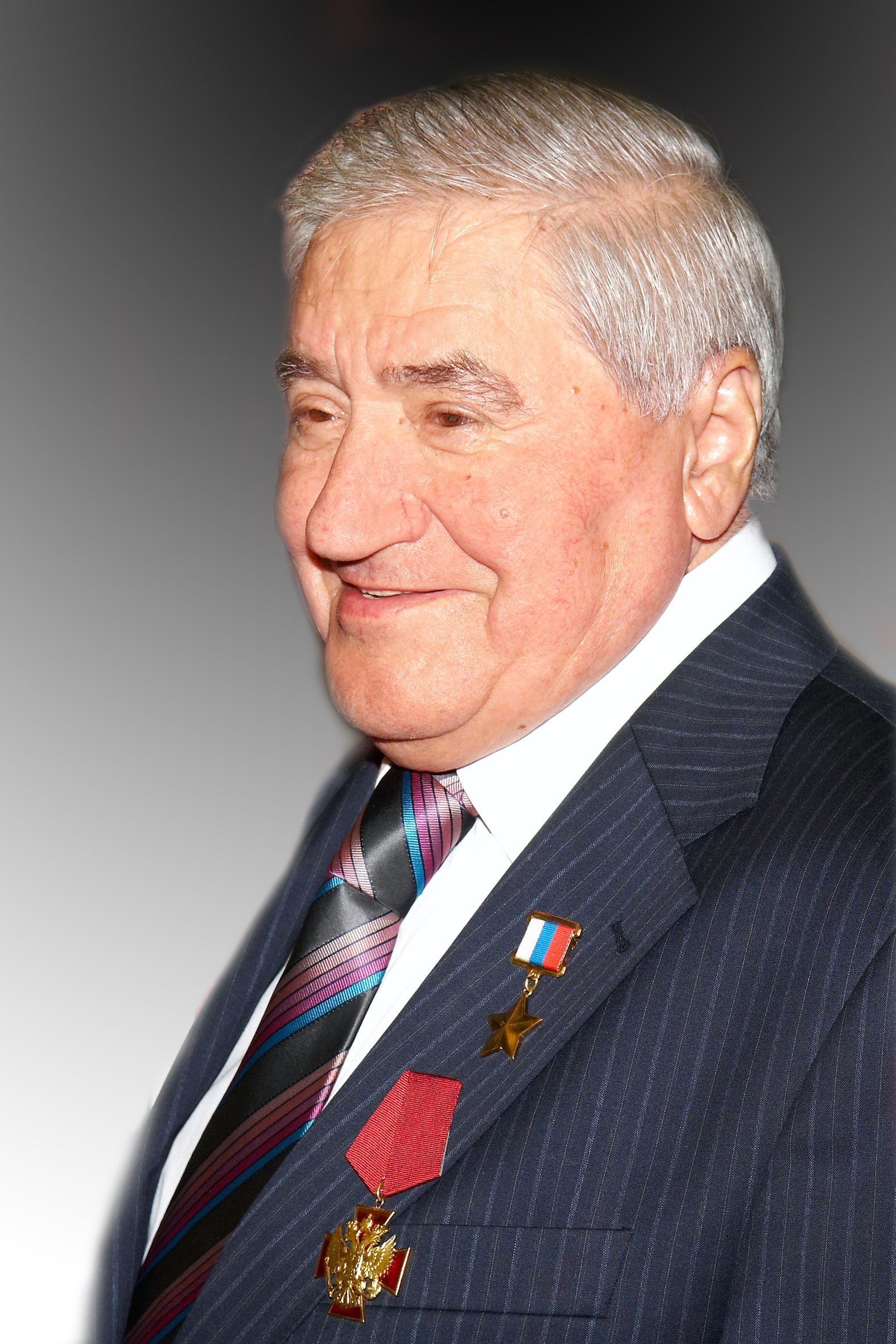
- Kozlov in 2010
- Born: 21 December 1934; Oparino, Oparinsky District, Kirov Oblast, RSFSR, Soviet Union
- Died: 2 November 2015 (aged 80)
- Education: Moscow State Institute of International Relations
- Occupation: Spy

Aleksey Mikhailovich Kozlov (Russian: Алексей Михайлович Козлов; 21 December 1934 – 2 November 2015) was a Soviet intelligence officer, who is recognized as a Hero of the Russian Federation. He held the rank of major in the KGB.

== Biography ==
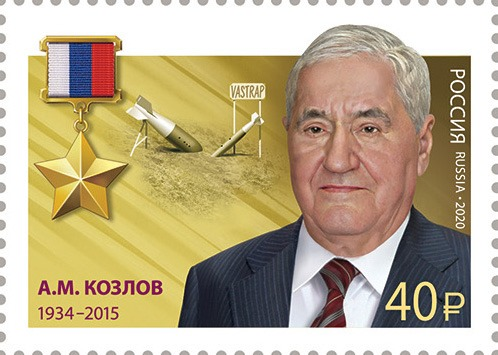
Kozlov on a 2020 Russian stamp

Kozlov's father was a World War II veteran, who fought in the Battle of Kursk as a tank battalion officer. In 1953 Kozlov entered the Moscow State Institute of International Relations, where he studied German and Danish. During his last year at the institute he was sent to Denmark for language practice. He later also became fluent in English, French and Italian.

In 1959 Kozlov became an intelligence officer, and since 1962 worked in Europe, Middle East and Africa. In the late 1970s he was appointed by the KGB to help monitor the Soviet government's financial assistance to anti-apartheid political movements in South Africa and South-West Africa (Namibia). Kozlov researched and prepared at least one report on how Soviet funds were being spent by the African National Congress (ANC). The nature of any other assignments he may have held remains disputed; South African prime minister P.W. Botha also claimed that he was involved in gauging popular support for the South-West African People's Organization (SWAPO). Kozlov undertook four trips to Southern Africa, including two specifically to South-West Africa, and soon became a person of interest to the National Intelligence Service. He was arrested for espionage at some point in 1981.

The KGB negotiated directly with Niel Barnard, South Africa's intelligence chief, for Kozlov's safe return; he was later swapped for eight unidentified Western nationals as part of a prisoner exchange in Europe.

In 2000, he was declared a Hero of the Russian Federation, for his "courage and heroism displayed during the performance of special operations".

He died on 2 November 2015.
