= Michael Chatfield =

American economist

Michael Chatfield (1930s-2004) was an American economist, accounting historian, and emeritus Professor of Accounting at the Southern Oregon University, known for his work on the history of accounting and accounting thought, and particularly for his History of Accounting: An International Encyclopedia, edited with Richard Vangermeersch.

== Biography ==
Chatfield obtained his BA and MBA from the University of Washington, and his DBA for the University of Oregon in 1966, and his Certified Public Accountant degree in the Los Angeles Chapter in 1968,.

After his graduation at the University of Washington Chatfield had started his career in industry at the Burroughs Corporation. After obtaining his Doctor of Business Administration in 1966 he joined the University of California, Los Angeles where he was appointed assistant professor of accounting, and in 1970 professor of accounting. After a long period at the University of California he moved to the Southern Oregon University, where he became professor of accounting.

Chatfield was awarded the Hourglass Award of the Academy of Accounting Historians twice, in 1974 solo and in 1996 with Richard Vangermeersch.

== Selected publications ==
- Chatfield, Michael, ed. Contemporary studies in the evolution of accounting thought. Dickenson Publishing Company, 1968.
- Chatfield, Michael. A history of accounting thought. RE Krieger Publishing Company, 1977.
- Chatfield, Michael, and Richard Vangermeersch, eds. The History of Accounting (RLE Accounting): An International Encyclopedia. Routledge, 1996/2014.

Articles, a selection:

- Chatfield, Michael. "The origins of cost accounting." Management accounting 52.12 (1971): 11–14.
- Chatfield, Michael. "The Accounting Review's first fifty years." Accounting Review (1975): 1–6.
- Carter, Thomas P., and Michael L. Chatfield. "Effective bilingual schools: Implications for policy and practice." American Journal of Education (1986): 200–232.
