= Chris Arena =

American singer-songwriter and producer

Christian Joseph "Chris" Arena is an American singer-songwriter and producer whose work can be seen across television networks such as ABC, ABC Family, CBS, The CW and others as well as feature films. Arena was nominated for a 2016 Emmy Award for 'Outstanding Original Song in Daytime Drama' for his song 'Dreams' written for ABC's "General Hospital". Most recently, Arena's work can be seen on "Catfish" and "Scream" on MTV. Other tracks, "Baby Fish", "Yes It Do", "Train", "City Inside Me", and "Closed Window" were featured in Season 4 of ABC's Pretty Little Liars. His song "Dreams" was used as a theme song on ABC's General Hospital in January 2015 as well as his latest song "Nothing's Gonna Stop Us", which was featured in TV Land's Younger in April 2015. His song "For You" was also picked for the romantic comedy/feature film, This Thing With Sarah.

== Music on television ==
Arena's music has been featured on Pretty Little Liars, Ravenswood, General Hospital, and Younger, as follows:

Song title	Show	Air date	Episode number
Babyfish	Pretty Little Liars	Aug. 13, 2013	S04 / Ep10
Yes It Do	Pretty Little Liars	Aug. 27, 2013	S04 / Ep12
Train	Pretty Little Liars	Jan. 07, 2014	S04 / Ep14
City Inside Me	Pretty Little Liars	Jan. 28, 2014	S04 / Ep17
Closed Window	Pretty Little Liars	Mar. 11, 2014	S04 / Ep23
Hennessy	Ravenswood	Jan. 14, 2014	S01 / Ep7
Dreams	General Hospital	Jan. 02, 2015	
Nothing's Gonna Stop Us	TV Land's Younger	Apr. 14, 2015	S01 / Ep4
Memory ft. I O N A	Scream: The TV Series	Sep. 1, 2015	S01 / Ep10
Wildest Dreams ft. Marissa Braun	Catfish: The TV Show	Apr. 15, 2015	S04 / Ep8
Wildest Dreams	MTV: Teen Mom	Jan. 5, 2016	S05 / Ep15
I Will Follow	MTV: Teen Mom	Mar. 7, 2016	S05 / Ep22

== Biography ==
Born into a music-oriented family, Arena was taught at a young age to play guitar by his father, an airline pilot who also grew up playing. Arena's grandfather played guitar as a jazz musician in New York City in the 1950s where he purchased what became a very rare 1959 Gibson Les Paul Standard Guitar. The guitar was passed down to Arena's father, who gave it to Chris in high school under the condition that he pursues music as a career. Many of Arena's tracks have been created using that same guitar.

In 2005, Arena moved from New Jersey to Memphis, Tennessee with his family, where he later attended the University of Memphis and received a BA in Music. After graduating in 2008, he began writing songs that would eventually comprise his debut album, Black. In 2010, he moved to Philadelphia after completing the recording sessions for his album. Upon receiving word that his acoustic piece "For You" would be featured in the indie film, This Thing With Sarah, he decided to move west where he could more seriously pursue a career in music. He moved to Los Angeles in 2011 and currently resides in Santa Monica.

== Career ==
In 2013 Arena's songs "Baby Fish", "Yes It Do", and "Train" were featured in Season 4 of ABC's Pretty Little Liars. The tracks "Crazy" and "Wait" were part of New Jersey surf documentary Dark Fall in 2010. His song "For You" was featured in the indie film This Thing With Sarah that was a contender in the Los Angeles Dances with Films festival in the Summer of 2013.

Arena performed at the Dark Fall premiere and encore showing at the House of Blues in Atlantic City, at subsequent showings in San Diego, CA as well as the Tribeca Surf Film Festival in New York, NY. In addition, Arena has performed at dozens of locations in many cities, including House of Blues and World Cafe Live.

In Fall 2012, Arena and British songwriter and producer, Stefan Skarbek collaborated on a new band, Blackout Cash that would feature Indie Rock infused with EDM. The first album is set to release Fall 2013. The band's track, "Nothings Gonna Stop Us", is a featured song on the newly released Xbox1's platform.

Arena writes, sings, and produces from his home studio in Santa Monica as well as at Mirrorball Entertainment studios in North Hollywood, CA. Mirrorball Music, a record label and publishing/production company founded in 2011, signed him to an 18-month co-publishing deal in July 2013. Mirrorball Entertainment is published by Downtown Music Publishing. Arena's music is under review and guidance of Grammy-award-winning record producer and audio engineer, Tony Maserati, who has worked with many mainstream artists including Beyonce on her hit "Crazy in Love", Jason Mraz (for which he won a grammy), Lady Gaga, and many more.

== Performances ==
Arena has performed at the Dark Fall première and encore showing at the former House of Blues in Atlantic City, NJ, with subsequent showings in San Diego, CA and at the Tribeca Surf Film Festival in New York, NY.

He also plays solo shows regularly in Philadelphia, Ardmore, and Doylestown, Pennsylvania, New York, NY, Margate, NJ, and Somers Point, New Jersey, and at the Rootstock Music Festival in Jackson Township

== Press ==
Arena's music has been featured on UK Music Magazine NME's online publication, featuring his song "Wait" used in Dark Fall as well as "Babyfish", an early track that was also featured in Pretty Little Liars.

Most recently, Arena was featured in Entertainment Weekly, and two articles of WetPaint WetPaint, for his work on Pretty Little Liars and Ravenswood. Previously, Arena and his album have been featured in The Press of Atlantic City (Atlantic City, NJ), dtown Magazine (Doylestown, PA), 54 Magazine (New Hope, PA) and on NJ.com. His album was announced online at Eat Sleep Breathe Music (the track Crazy was the blog's Song of the Day on August 8, 2010), and in the Raves and Faves section of Atlantic City Weekly in 2010.

== Reception ==
Lou Russo of dtown Magazine described Arena's CD as "an alternately intimate and anthemic slice of indie rock and neo-folk" and Mike Reynolds of NJ.com noted that he "could take his music in a million directions and it'll be fun to watch where he goes".
