= Kelli Arena =

American television journalist

- Education: Tisch School of the Arts
- Occupation: Television journalist
- Years active: 1985–present
- Employer: National Security Agency
- Known for: Former CNN Washington, D.C. correspondent
- Title: Chief of Strategic Communications

Kelli Arena is an American television journalist known as a former Washington, D.C., correspondent for CNN.

She is the chief of strategic communications for the National Security Agency. Arena was formerly the Executive Director of the Global Center for Journalism and Democracy at Sam Houston State University, and held the Dan Rather Endowed Chair. She also owned her own communications firm RKC Solutions.

== Career ==
Arena started with CNN in 1985 as a production assistant. In 1989 she was named the executive producer of daytime programming for CNN financial news. In 1990, she produced the program Moneyline with Lou Dobbs. In 1991, she went to work for CNN in London as an executive producer for the program World Business Today. She returned to New York in 1992 and was named News Director for all of CNN's financial programming.

She started her on-air career in London as a business reporter in 1993, later moving to Tokyo in 1994. In 1995 Arena moved to Washington DC covering U.S. government news as a business reporter. Arena was promoted to Justice Correspondent in 2000.

She had reported for CNN programs American Morning, The Situation Room, and Anderson Cooper 360°.

She left CNN in January 2009.

She appeared as a panelist on truTV's In Session.
