= Sammy Arena =

American singer

Sammy Arena (September 1, 1931 – December 5, 2012) was an American professional music artist.

Arena was born in Tampa, Florida, and raised in Ybor City. He attended George Washington Junior High. He and his brother Andrew started their career in 1959 at one of Tampa's music recording company and recorded 14 records. The Arena brothers once performed at a music event for Bob Graham. During 1967, Sammy managed to perform on The Strange Fetishes and Pain and Pleasure and in 1979 he lastly acted in The Amazing Mr. No Legs.

He had a kidney transplant in 1994, but died of heart problems in 2012, aged 81, in his native Tampa.
