= Ramil Khayrulin =

- Born: Khayrulin Ramil Ratmirovich; 23 January 1985 (age 40); Moscow
- Occupations: Film producer, filmmaker, screenwriter

Khayrulin, Ramil Ratmirovich (Russian: Хайрулин, Рамиль Ратмирович; born January 23, 1985) is a Russian film producer, filmmaker and screenwriter.

== Biography ==
In 2007 he graduated from the Russian National Research Medical University, medical-biological faculty, specialty physician biophysicist.

From 2005 to 2006 he worked in "All PROkat+" the managing editor and reporter.

In 2009, the youth engaged in politics in North-Eastern Administrative Okrug, Moscow, Russia, was an assistant to a member of the Public Council of the City of Moscow "The Commission on transnational migration policy" and has worked in the youth newspaper "Northern Lights" editor.

In 2009 opened the NGO "Independent Humanitarian Projects". The main activities are the key concerns of the employment and training of young people with disabilities. In April 2009 took part in the forum of people with disabilities within the framework of the Film Festival SyrFilmFest'09, Syracuse, New York, USA, where they held a run movies Edward Topol "At the edge of the stand" and Sergei Govorukhin "No one but us ..." about people past the hot spots.

Since 2010 - General Producer "TVOROG Media Group".

In 2011 he made his debut with the film project "Dolls", directed by Artem Arakelyan as a producer. In the same year joined the jury for the contest final directorial project Film Festival "Artkino".

In 2012 he became a producer on "Arena", directed by Edward Bordukova, who became member of the program ShortFilmCorner the 66th Cannes Film Festival. One of the main roles in the film played a famous young actor Azamat Nigmanov (Best Actor at the 23rd festival "Kinotavr" for the movie "Convoy", filmmaker Aleksei Mizgiryov).

From 2012 to 2013, executive producer of the film documentary project "Muslims are proud of Russia". The project is aimed at real-world examples to show that there is no conflict between the terms "Muslim" and "Russian patriot".

In 2013, the executive producer of the film "And we love life" about the life of the blockade of Gaza, Palestina made «ART FILM» and «TVOROG Media Group» with the participation of Prime Minister of the Gaza Ismail Haniyeh, directed by Abdulla Issa. This unusual pattern is somewhere between fiction and documentary films: within invented scenario shows the real heroes and stories, filmed real-life situations and emotions of the people who survived the terrible tragedy.

== Filmography ==
Year	Film	Credited as				
Year	Film	Film director	Film producer	Film executive producer	Actor	Screenwriter
2013	And we love life			Yes		
2013	Road to Mecca. Abdulaziz Davletshin			Yes		
2012	Finest hour Salizhan Sharipov			Yes		
2012	Ahead of its time. Haidar Musin			Yes		
2012	Arena		Yes			
2012	Astra, I love you. Alina				Yes	
2012	Affect		Yes			
2011	Direct Power		Yes			
2011	The crisis		Yes			
2011	There, where there are star		Yes			
2010	Paper childhood	Yes	Yes			Yes

== Participation and awards ==
- 2012 Member of-competition program International Festival of Cinematography VGIK - film «The crisis»
- 2012 Member of the documentary program at the Moscow festival of short films «Film Debut» - film «The crisis»
- 2012 Prize «Golden frets» Film Festival «Meeting of Vyatka» - film «There, where there are star»
- 2013 Member of the competitive program VII Moscow Short Film Festival «Debut film», Moscow, Russia - film «Arena»
- 2013 Member of the competitive program 5th Ljubljana International Short Film Festival in Slovenia - film «Arena»
- 2013 Member of the competition program of the 14th KAN Film Festival in Poland - film «Arena»
- 2013 Diploma at the 36th Film Festival Grenzland-Filmtage in Germany - film «Arena»
- 2013 Member of the festival competition program 8th Monaco Charity Film Festival, Monaco - film «Arena»
- 2013 66th Cannes Film Festival, program Short Film Corner, France - film «Arena»
- 2013 Member of the «Short and Sweet» VII International Film Festival Andrei Tarkovsky's «The Mirror» in Ivanovo, Russia - film «Arena»
- 2013 Member of the «NO ANESTHESIA» 9th International short and animation film festival OPEN CINEMA in Saint Petersburg, Russia - film «Arena»
- 2013 Member of -competition program «Curiosities» 1st International Short Film Festival «SHORT» in Kaliningrad, Russia - film «Arena»
- 2013 Special Prize «Granat» from partners «KONIK Film Festival» GBUK «Moscow Cinema» on «KONIK» Film-Festival in Moscow, Russia - film «Arena»
