= Arenas de San Juan =

Municipality of Ciudad Real, Spain

Coordinates: 39°13′N 3°30′W

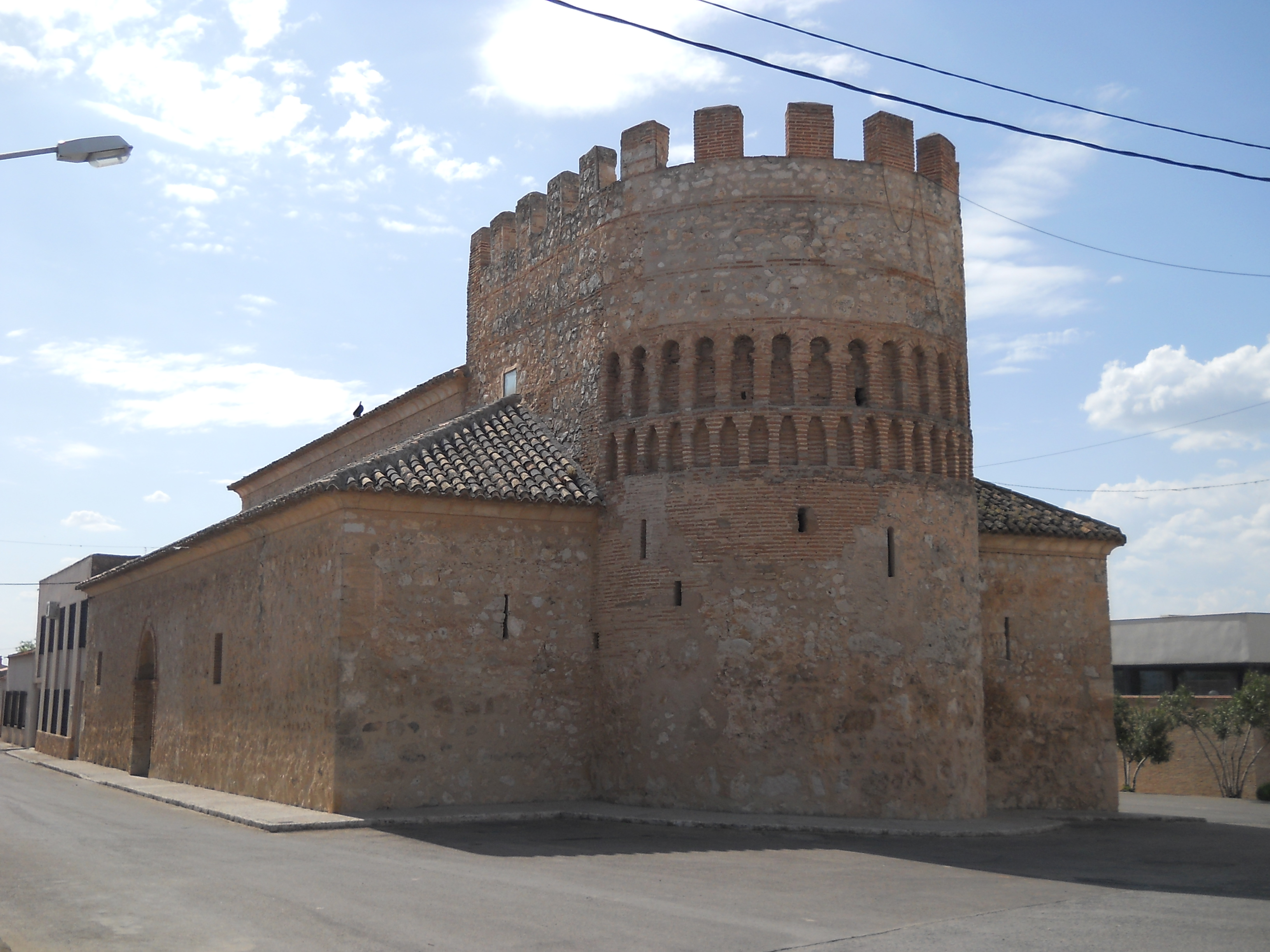
Church of Santa María de las Angustias in Arenas de San Juan, Ciudad Real, Spain

Coat of arms of Arenas de San Juan

Arenas de San Juan is a municipality in Ciudad Real, Castile-La Mancha, Spain. It has a population of 1,061.
