= Accounting Historians Journal =

- Discipline: History of accounting
- Language: English
- Edited by: Bill Black

Publication details
- Former name: The Accounting Historian
- History: 1974–present
- Publisher: Academy of Accounting Historians
- Frequency: Biannually

Standard abbreviations
- ISO 4: Account. Hist. J.

Indexing
- ISSN: 0148-4184 (print); 2327-4468 (web)
- JSTOR: accohistjour

Links
- Journal homepage

The Accounting Historians Journal is a biannual peer-reviewed academic journal published by the Academy of Accounting Historians. It is abstracted and indexed in Scopus.

== History ==
The journal was established in 1977, as a successor of The Accounting Historian, a quarterly newsletter published by the Academy of Accounting Historians between 1974 and 1976. The original newsletters were collected and published in 1981 as volumes 1 to 3 of the Accounting Historians Journal.
