= Arenas River =

Arenas River may refer to:

- Arenas River (Las Marias, Puerto Rico)
- Arenas River (Yabucoa, Puerto Rico)
