= Academic Pediatric Association =

- Formation: 1960
- Type: Professional Association
- Headquarters: Old Mclean Village Drive, Mclean, VA
- Location: United States
- Official language: English
- APA Board: Board of Directors
- Website: academicpeds.org

The Academic Pediatric Association (APA) is a professional pediatric organization that represents approximately 2,000+ health care professionals in academic general pediatrics. Membership is open to physicians, nurse practitioners, doctoral trained professionals, students, and other child health experts. For the past 20 years, the APA has been one of the co-sponsors (along with the American Academy of Pediatrics and the Society for Pediatric Research) of the annual Pediatric Academic Societies meeting, the largest regular pediatric research meeting in the world. The APA also sponsors regional meetings and provides members with numerous forums to collaborate on academic endeavors that benefit children. Four standing committees (Education, Research, Health Care Delivery, Public Policy and Advocacy) direct multiple programs within the APA, and its 38 special interest groups (SIGS) work on areas relevant to child health.

== History ==
The APA was begun in 1960 when pediatric leaders recognized the need to develop pediatric outpatient departments for better service to patients and for the teaching of students and pediatric physicians in training. It was originally named the Association for Ambulatory Pediatric Services. In 1968 the name was modified to the Ambulatory Pediatric Association. In 2007, the name was changed again to the Academic Pediatric Association to reflect the diverse venues and generalist professional work of its membership.

== Education ==
Education Committee - oversees the numerous educational activities of the APA including the Educational Scholars Program, Educational Guidelines Project, AGP Fellowship Accreditation Program, Resident/Fellows Corner, educational meetings and many other projects

== Research ==
The Research Committee focuses on various programs such as BORN (Better Outcomes through Research for Newborns), CORNET (COntinuity Research NETwork), PRIS (Pediatric Research in Inpatient Settings) and Young Investigator Awards.

== Health Care Delivery ==
The Health Care Delivery Committee aims to identify effective strategies to care for all children, with a particular focus on vulnerable adults.

== Public Policy and Advocacy ==
The Public Policy and Advocacy Committee keeps current with legislative and public policy issues relating to children’s health while working collaboratively with other children’s health leaders and organizations.

== Leadership Programs and Meetings ==
The New Century Scholars Program is a mentorship program aimed at increasing the diversity of the academic general pediatric workforce.

The Educational Scholars Program is a national faculty development program . This program awards a Certificate of Excellence in Educational Scholarship.

Annual Leadership Meetings provide an educational forum .

== Regions ==
There are 10 regions which hold regional meetings and provide members with collaborative activities.

== Special Interest Groups ==
APA Special Interest Groups (SIGs) provides a forum for interested members to collaborate and facilitate communication in a particular area of general pediatrics. It has 38 special interest groups (SIGS) working on critical areas relevant to child health. that members can join.

== Publications ==
The 'APA Focus' is a bi-monthly newsletter published to increase timely communication with members. Each issue highlights aspects of the primary mission of the APA - Education, Research, Public Policy and Advocacy, Health Care Delivery and information about the Pediatric Academic Societies Annual Meeting, of which the APA is a primary sponsor.

Academic Pediatrics, the official journal of the Academic Pediatric Association, is a peer-reviewed publication whose purpose is to strengthen the research and educational base of academic general pediatrics. The content areas of the journal reflect the interests of Association members and other health professionals who care for children.

== See also ==
- American Academy of Pediatrics
- American College of Pediatricians
- American Pediatric Society
