= Arena (2013 film) =

- Directed by: Eduard Bordukov
- Written by: Eduard Bordukov
- Produced by: Khayrulin Ramil
- Starring: Azamat Nigmanov; Vlad Dunaev; Vadim Dorofeev; Ilya Zhinilo
- Cinematography: Ilya Kondratev
- Edited by: Aleksandr Koshelev
- Music by: Mark Leyn
- Production company: TVOROG Media Group
- Release date: May 20, 2013 (France)
- Running time: 22 minutes
- Country: Russia
- Language: Russian

Arena (Russian: Арена) is a 2013 Russian film, directed by Eduard Bordukov and produced by Khayrulin Ramil. It had its world premiere at the 66th Cannes Film Festival as part of the non-competitive program ShortFilmCorner. One of the main roles in the film played a famous young actor Azamat Nigmanov (Best Actor at the 23rd Kinotavr for the film Convoy by Aleksei Mizgiryov).

== Synopsis ==
The story follows three victims, an Uzbek man and two policemen, who become trapped inside a cruel, inescapable Moscow courtyard labyrinth while a hostile crowd watches and demands for "bread and circuses."

== Cast ==
- Azamat Nigmanov as Erbalat
- Vlad Dunaev as Kolia
- Vadim Dorofeev as Semion
- Ilya Zhinilo as leader of the skinhead

== Accolades ==
- 2013 Special Prize "Granat" from partners "KONIK Film Festival" GBUK "Moscow Cinema" on "KONIK" Film-Festival in Moscow, Russia
- 2013 Member of -competition program "Curiosities" 1st International Short Film Festival "SHORT" in Kaliningrad, Russia
- 2013 Member of the "NO ANESTHESIA" 9th International short and animation film festival OPEN CINEMA in Saint Petersburg, Russia
- 2013 Member of the "Short and Sweet" VII International Film Festival Andrei Tarkovsky's "The Mirror" in Ivanovo, Russia
- 2013 66th Cannes Film Festival, program Short Film Corner, France
- 2013 Member of the festival competition program 8th Monaco Charity Film Festival, Monaco
- 2013 Diploma at the 36th Film Festival Grenzland-Filmtage in Germany
- 2013 Member of the competition program of the 14th KAN Film Festival in Poland
- 2013 Member of the competitive program 5th Ljubljana International Short Film Festival in Slovenia
- 2013 Member of the competitive program VII Moscow Short Film Festival "Debut film", Moscow, Russia
