= Yolanda Arenas =

Cuban actress

- Born: Cuba
- Occupation: Actress

Yolanda (Arenas) Sabbatini (November 1934 - 23 October 2026) was a Cuban actress who trained in dance and theater in Havana, Cuba.

== Biography ==
Among her various credits in Cuba, Arenas participated in the theater group Prometeo (under the direction of Francisco Morín) for two years in the late 1950s, acting in Los novios and in the 1960 film Cuba '58.

In 1968 she went into exile in New York, where she performed with the Repertorio Español theater company. Arenas also did commercials and voiceover work.

She resided in Miami, Florida, until her death on October 23, 2026.

== Works or publications ==
- La celestina : la tragicomedia de Calisto y Melibea. 1978. OCLC 84143221.
- Romeo y Julieta. 1979. OCLC 77592294.
