= Edward N. Coffman =

Edward N. (Ed) Coffman (1942 – July 24, 2014) was an American accounting scholar and Professor of accounting at Virginia Commonwealth University. Coffman was especially known for his work on accounting history: its definition, relevance, and methodology.

== Biography ==
Coffman was born and raised in West Point, Virginia, where his father worked at the local paper mill. After high school Coffman initially started working there as well. He returned to college in 1962, to the Virginia Commonwealth University, where he obtained his BA in 1965 and his MA in 1967. In 1970 he obtained his PhD from George Washington University.

Coffman started his academic career at the Virginia Commonwealth University from 1966 to 1968. After his Ph.D. graduation he returned and taught accounting at its VCU School of Business, for 44 years. He was Visiting Professor at many universities, and the Virginia Society of CPAs awarded him the Outstanding Accounting Educator Award.

== Selected publications ==
- Daniel L. Jensen, Edward N. Coffman, Thomas Junior Burns. Advanced accounting and the rule-making agencies, 1980.
- Jensen, Daniel L., and Edward N. Coffman. Accounting for changing prices. Reston Publishing Co., 1984.
- Coffman, Edward N., Rasoul H. Tondkar, and Gary John Previts. Historical perspectives of selected financial accounting topics. Richard D. Irwin, Inc., 1993.

Articles, a selection:

- Burns, Thomas J.; Coffman, Edward N. (1976). "The Accounting Hall of Fame: A Profile of the Members". Journal of Accounting Research. 14 (2): 342–347. doi:10.2307/2490547. JSTOR 2490547.
- Previts, Gary John, Lee D. Parker, and Edward N. Coffman. "An accounting historiography: subject matter and methodology." Abacus 26.2 (1990): 136-158.
- Chase, Bruce W., and Edward N. Coffman. "Choice of accounting method by not-for-profit institutions accounting for investments by colleges and universities." Journal of Accounting and Economics 18.2 (1994): 233-243.
- Previts, Gary John, Lee D. Parker, and Edward N. Coffman. "Accounting history: definition and relevance." Abacus 26.1 (1990): 1-16.
