= Arena, Wisconsin =

- Village
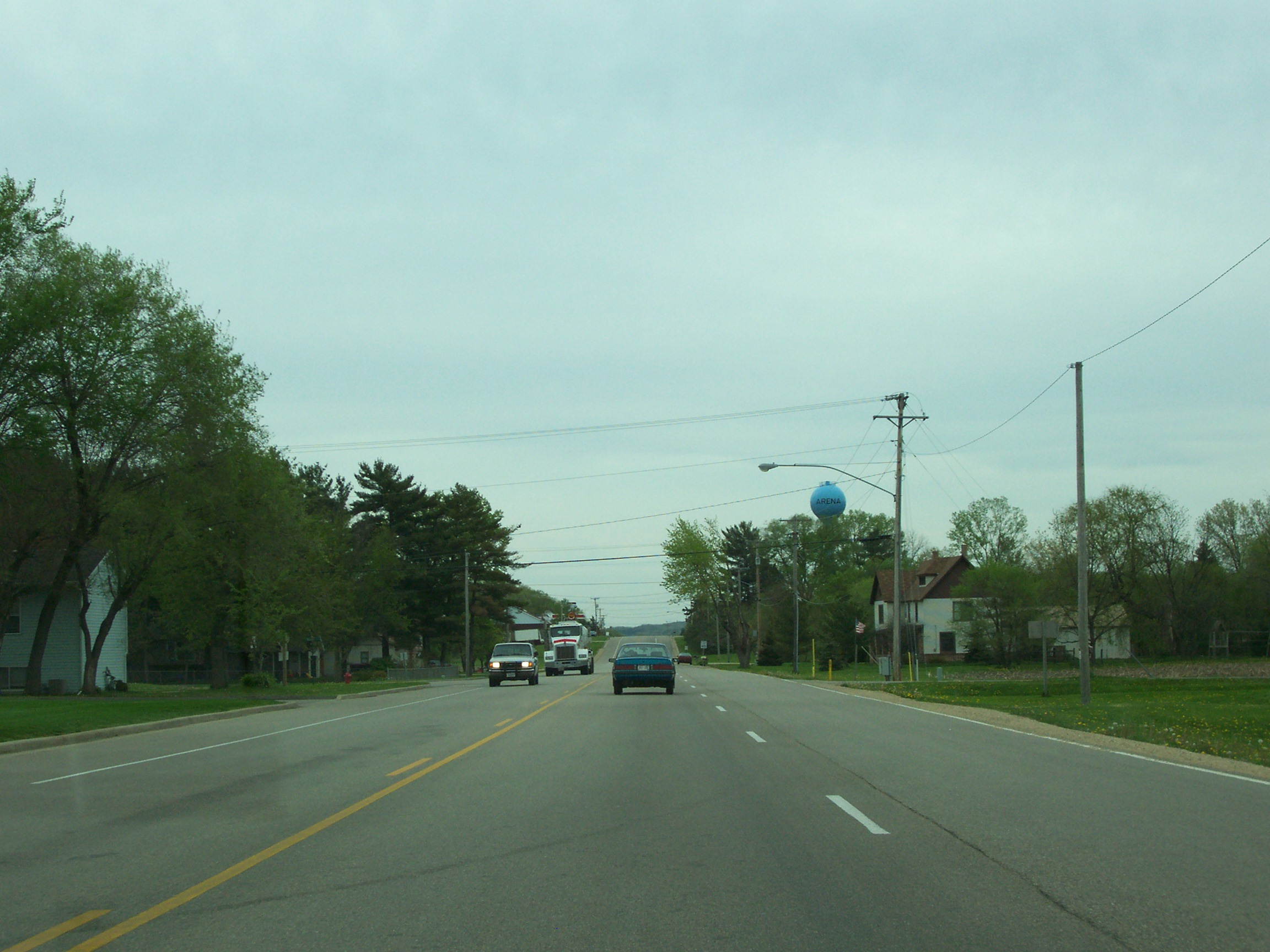
- The view from highway 14 which runs along the edge of the village.

- Location of Arena in Iowa County, Wisconsin.
- Coordinates: 43°8′25″N 89°55′53″W
- Country: United States
- State: Wisconsin
- County: Iowa

Area
  - Total: 1.16 sq mi (3.00 km^{2})
  - Land: 1.15 sq mi (2.99 km^{2})
  - Water: 0.0039 sq mi (0.01 km^{2})
- Elevation: 863 ft (263 m)

Population (2020)
  - Total: 844
  - Density: 731/sq mi (282/km^{2})
- Time zone: UTC-6 (Central (CST))
  - Summer (DST): UTC-5 (CDT)
- Area code: 608
- FIPS code: 55-02575
- GNIS feature ID: 1582707
- Website: https://www.villageofarenawi.gov/

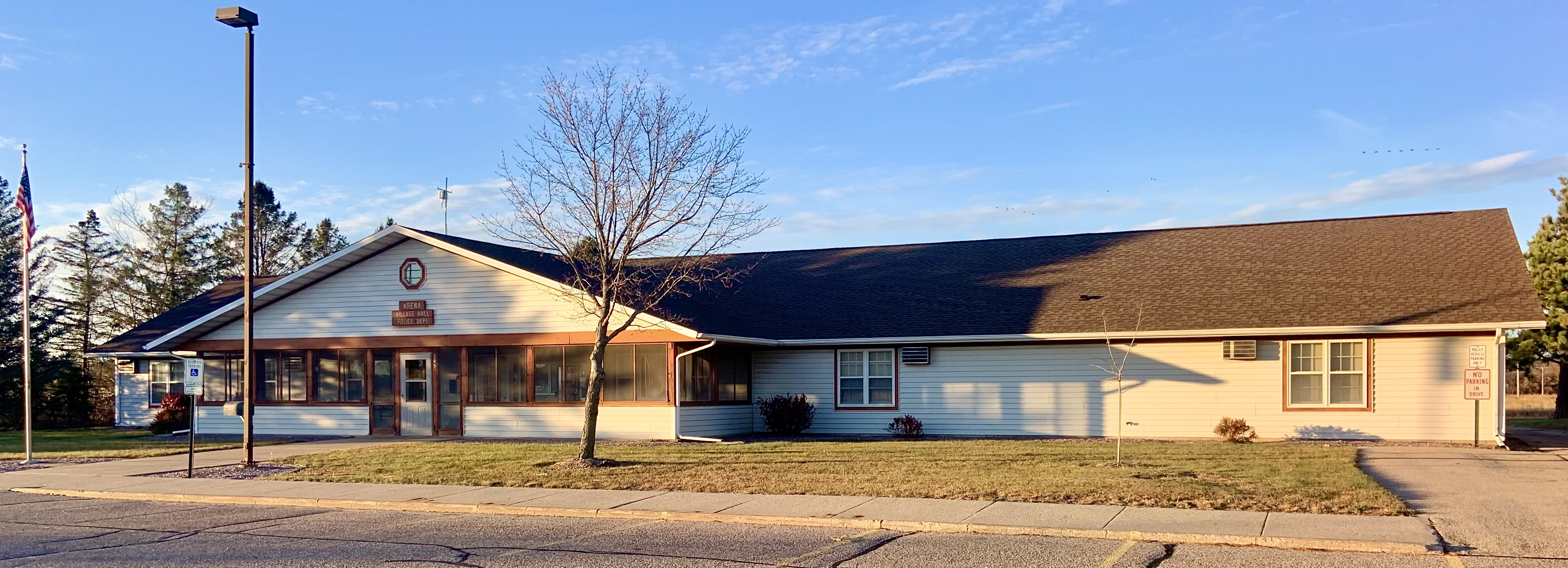
Arena Village Hall

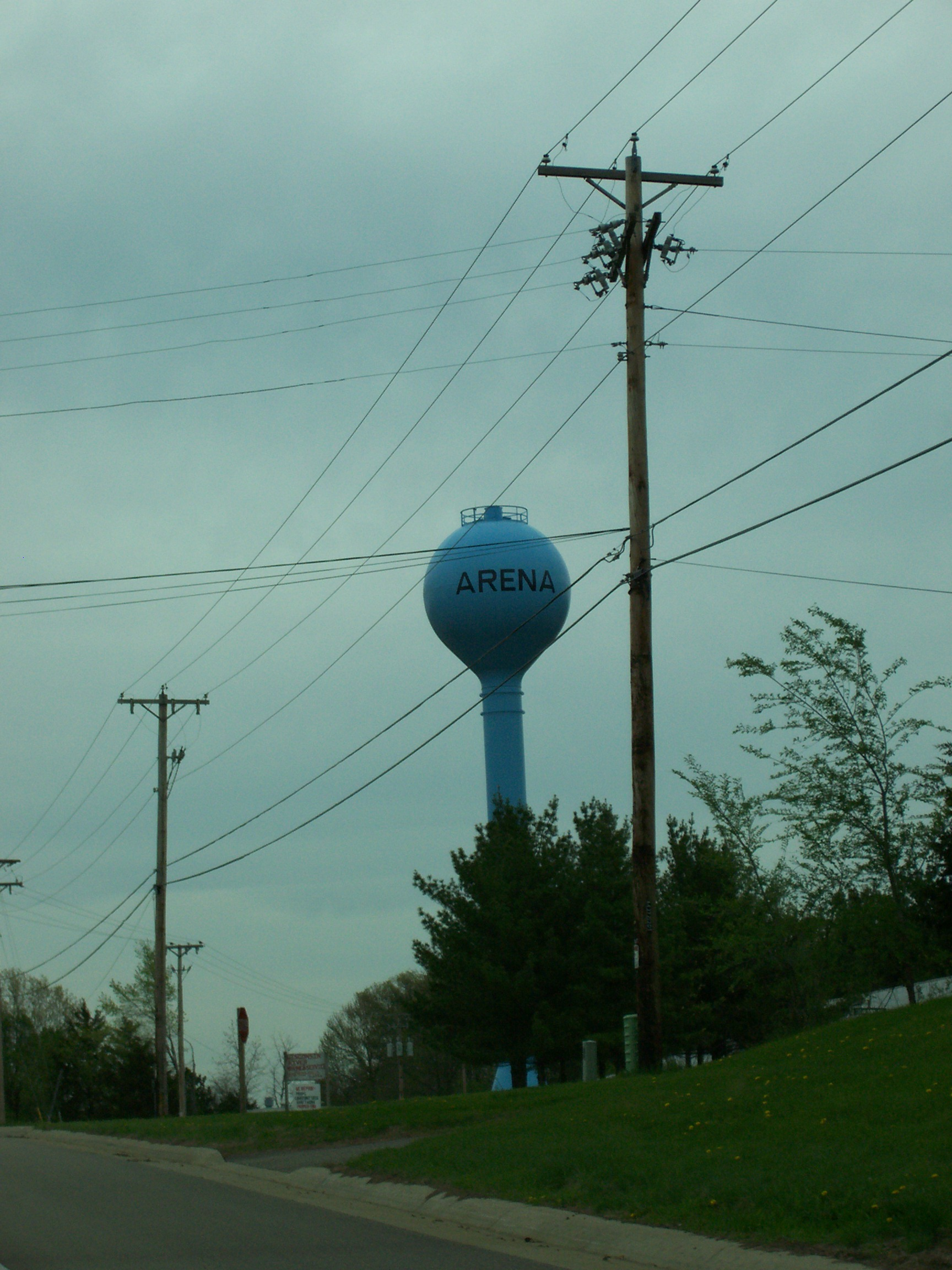
Water tower

Arena is a village in Iowa County, Wisconsin, United States. The population was 844 at the 2020 census. The village is located within the Town of Arena. It is part of the Madison Metropolitan Statistical Area.

== Geography ==
Arena is located at 43°9′57″N 89°54′26″W (43.166108, -89.907305).

According to the United States Census Bureau, the village has a total area of 1.16 square miles (3.00 km^{2}), of which 1.15 square miles (2.98 km^{2}) is land and 0.01 square miles (0.03 km^{2}) is water.

== Demographics ==
Historical population
Census	Pop.	Note	%±
1880	266		—
1890	354		33.1%
1930	273		—
1940	278		1.8%
1950	296		6.5%
1960	309		4.4%
1970	377		22.0%
1980	451		19.6%
1990	525		16.4%
2000	685		30.5%
2010	834		21.8%
2020	844		1.2%
U.S. Decennial Census

=== 2010 census ===
As of the census of 2010, there were 834 people, 323 households, and 220 families living in the village. The population density was 725.2 inhabitants per square mile (280.0/km^{2}). There were 354 housing units at an average density of 307.8 per square mile (118.8/km^{2}). The racial makeup of the village was 97.8% White, 0.2% African American, 0.1% Native American, 0.5% Asian, 0.2% Pacific Islander, 0.5% from other races, and 0.6% from two or more races. Hispanic or Latino of any race were 1.8% of the population.

There were 323 households, of which 39.0% had children under the age of 18 living with them, 52.6% were married couples living together, 11.5% had a female householder with no husband present, 4.0% had a male householder with no wife present, and 31.9% were non-families. 26.3% of all households were made up of individuals, and 7.5% had someone living alone who was 65 years of age or older. The average household size was 2.58 and the average family size was 3.14.

The median age in the village was 33.4 years. 29.6% of residents were under the age of 18; 6.7% were between the ages of 18 and 24; 33.2% were from 25 to 44; 22.7% were from 45 to 64; and 7.9% were 65 years of age or older. The gender makeup of the village was 50.7% male and 49.3% female.

=== 2000 census ===
As of the census of 2000, there were 685 people, 256 households, and 182 families living in the village. The population density was 628.5 people per square mile (242.6/km^{2}). There were 269 housing units at an average density of 246.8 per square mile (95.3/km^{2}). The racial makeup of the village was 98.54% White, 1.31% Asian, and 0.15% from two or more races. 0.73% of the population were Hispanic or Latino of any race.

There were 256 households, out of which 37.9% had children under the age of 18 living with them, 53.9% were married couples living together, 10.2% had a female householder with no husband present, and 28.9% were non-families. 24.6% of all households were made up of individuals, and 9.8% had someone living alone who was 65 years of age or older. The average household size was 2.68 and the average family size was 3.14.

In the village, the population was spread out, with 30.2% under the age of 18, 6.9% from 18 to 24, 35.2% from 25 to 44, 18.2% from 45 to 64, and 9.5% who were 65 years of age or older. The median age was 32 years. For every 100 females, there were 106.3 males. For every 100 females age 18 and over, there were 103.4 males.

The median income for a household in the village was $45,870, and the median income for a family was $49,375. Males had a median income of $31,953 versus $24,688 for females. The per capita income for the village was $20,765. None of the families and 3.7% of the population were living below the poverty line, including no under eighteens and 11.1% of those over 64.

== Education ==
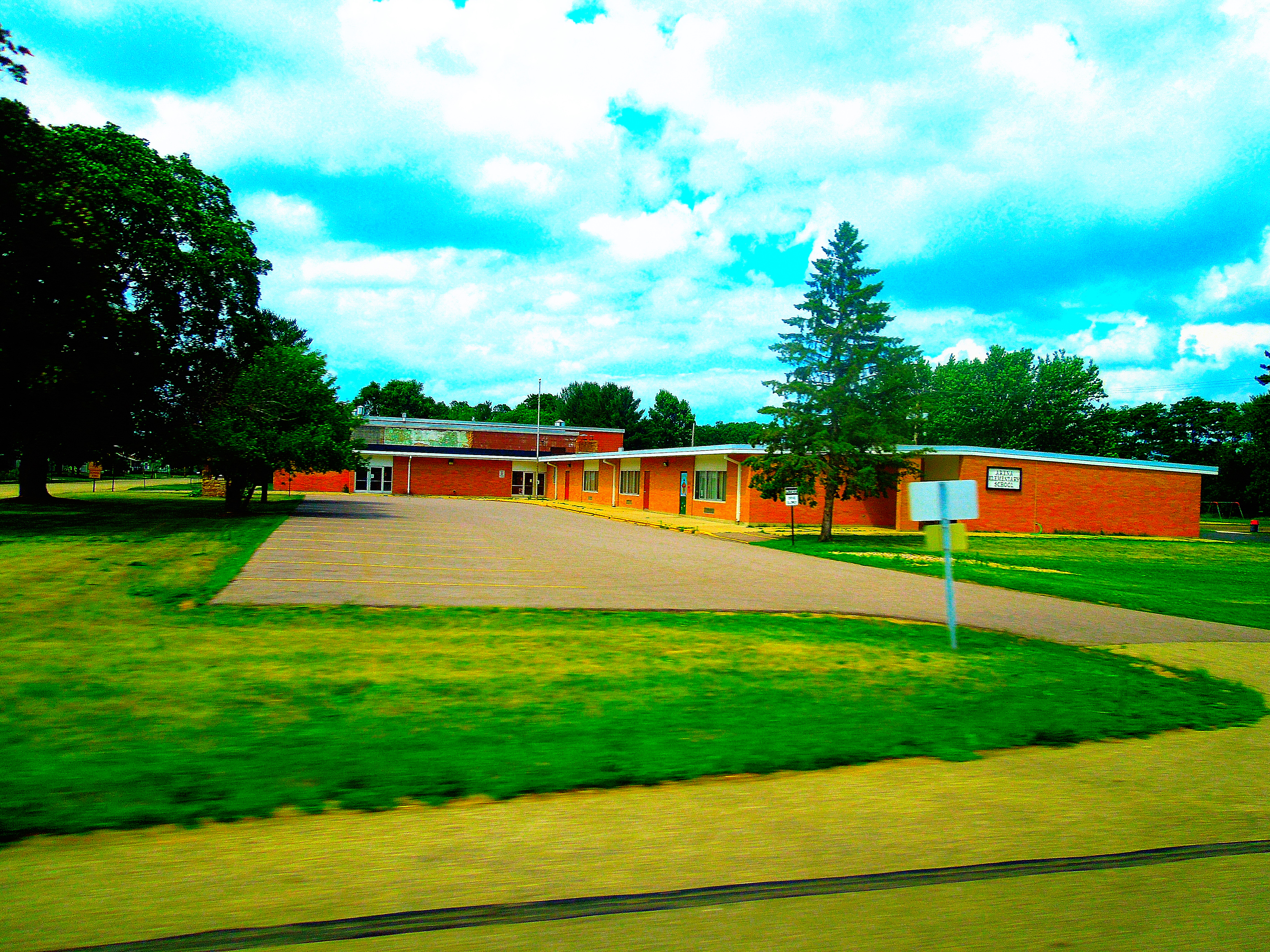
Arena Elementary School, which closed in 2018

Arena is served by the River Valley School District.

Students attend school in Spring Green. Arena Elementary School closed in 2018. The distance between the two communities is approximately 10 miles (16 km). The Arena Elementary closure damaged relationships among community residents. It was the sole school in the town.

== Economy ==
In 2018, some residents held employment in Madison, Wisconsin.

== Notable people ==
- William Henry Brisbane, chaplain, lived in Arena, Wisconsin
- Thomas J. Burns, educator
- William E. Rowe, miller and legislator
