= Academy of Accounting Historians =

The Academy of Accounting Historians, established in 1973, is a non-profit organization of scholars of accounting history.

== History ==
The organization was formed at the initiative of Gary John Previts, then of the University of Alabama, who in 1973 wrote to various academics to ascertain their interest in establishing an organization devoted to accounting history scholarship. Having received a number of expressions of interest in contributing to the formation of the organization, Previts formed a steering committee. The group held its first meeting during the course of the 1973 annual meeting of the American Accounting Association, held that year at Laval University in Quebec City, Canada. Previts was elected as the Academy's first president. Later that year, the Academy was formally incorporated as a non-profit organization, under the laws of the State of Alabama.

The Academy sponsors two publications, the Accounting Historians Journal, established in 1974, and the Accounting Historians Notebook, established in 1978.
